

614001–614100 

|-bgcolor=#fefefe
| 614001 ||  || — || August 7, 2008 || Kitt Peak || Spacewatch ||  || align=right data-sort-value="0.72" | 720 m || 
|-id=002 bgcolor=#E9E9E9
| 614002 ||  || — || August 7, 2008 || Kitt Peak || Spacewatch ||  || align=right data-sort-value="0.93" | 930 m || 
|-id=003 bgcolor=#E9E9E9
| 614003 ||  || — || August 20, 2008 || Kitt Peak || Spacewatch || GEF || align=right data-sort-value="0.79" | 790 m || 
|-id=004 bgcolor=#FA8072
| 614004 ||  || — || August 21, 2008 || Kitt Peak || Spacewatch ||  || align=right data-sort-value="0.52" | 520 m || 
|-id=005 bgcolor=#fefefe
| 614005 ||  || — || August 26, 2008 || Pises || Pises Obs. || NYS || align=right data-sort-value="0.53" | 530 m || 
|-id=006 bgcolor=#d6d6d6
| 614006 ||  || — || August 25, 2008 || La Sagra || OAM Obs. ||  || align=right | 1.8 km || 
|-id=007 bgcolor=#fefefe
| 614007 ||  || — || August 25, 2008 || La Sagra || OAM Obs. ||  || align=right data-sort-value="0.71" | 710 m || 
|-id=008 bgcolor=#fefefe
| 614008 ||  || — || August 26, 2008 || La Sagra || OAM Obs. || MAS || align=right data-sort-value="0.87" | 870 m || 
|-id=009 bgcolor=#E9E9E9
| 614009 ||  || — || August 27, 2008 || Pises || Pises Obs. ||  || align=right data-sort-value="0.67" | 670 m || 
|-id=010 bgcolor=#fefefe
| 614010 ||  || — || August 21, 2008 || Kitt Peak || Spacewatch || V || align=right data-sort-value="0.54" | 540 m || 
|-id=011 bgcolor=#fefefe
| 614011 ||  || — || August 30, 2008 || Bergisch Gladbach || W. Bickel ||  || align=right data-sort-value="0.71" | 710 m || 
|-id=012 bgcolor=#d6d6d6
| 614012 ||  || — || August 28, 2008 || Pises || Pises Obs. ||  || align=right | 3.8 km || 
|-id=013 bgcolor=#E9E9E9
| 614013 ||  || — || August 21, 2008 || Kitt Peak || Spacewatch ||  || align=right | 1.1 km || 
|-id=014 bgcolor=#d6d6d6
| 614014 ||  || — || August 21, 2008 || Kitt Peak || Spacewatch ||  || align=right | 2.0 km || 
|-id=015 bgcolor=#C2FFFF
| 614015 ||  || — || August 24, 2008 || Kitt Peak || Spacewatch || L4ERY || align=right | 6.4 km || 
|-id=016 bgcolor=#E9E9E9
| 614016 ||  || — || August 26, 2008 || Siding Spring || SSS ||  || align=right | 1.9 km || 
|-id=017 bgcolor=#E9E9E9
| 614017 ||  || — || August 21, 2008 || Kitt Peak || Spacewatch ||  || align=right data-sort-value="0.76" | 760 m || 
|-id=018 bgcolor=#fefefe
| 614018 ||  || — || August 24, 2008 || Socorro || LINEAR || MAS || align=right data-sort-value="0.66" | 660 m || 
|-id=019 bgcolor=#fefefe
| 614019 ||  || — || September 2, 2008 || Kitt Peak || Spacewatch ||  || align=right data-sort-value="0.76" | 760 m || 
|-id=020 bgcolor=#E9E9E9
| 614020 ||  || — || September 2, 2008 || Kitt Peak || Spacewatch ||  || align=right | 1.2 km || 
|-id=021 bgcolor=#FA8072
| 614021 ||  || — || September 3, 2008 || Kitt Peak || Spacewatch ||  || align=right data-sort-value="0.74" | 740 m || 
|-id=022 bgcolor=#fefefe
| 614022 ||  || — || September 4, 2008 || Kitt Peak || Spacewatch ||  || align=right data-sort-value="0.43" | 430 m || 
|-id=023 bgcolor=#E9E9E9
| 614023 ||  || — || September 4, 2008 || Kitt Peak || Spacewatch || critical || align=right data-sort-value="0.69" | 690 m || 
|-id=024 bgcolor=#FA8072
| 614024 ||  || — || September 4, 2008 || Kitt Peak || Spacewatch ||  || align=right | 1.4 km || 
|-id=025 bgcolor=#d6d6d6
| 614025 ||  || — || September 5, 2008 || Socorro || LINEAR ||  || align=right | 2.4 km || 
|-id=026 bgcolor=#d6d6d6
| 614026 ||  || — || September 2, 2008 || Kitt Peak || Spacewatch || THM || align=right | 1.7 km || 
|-id=027 bgcolor=#fefefe
| 614027 ||  || — || September 2, 2008 || Kitt Peak || Spacewatch ||  || align=right data-sort-value="0.47" | 470 m || 
|-id=028 bgcolor=#E9E9E9
| 614028 ||  || — || September 2, 2008 || Kitt Peak || Spacewatch ||  || align=right | 1.1 km || 
|-id=029 bgcolor=#E9E9E9
| 614029 ||  || — || September 3, 2008 || Kitt Peak || Spacewatch ||  || align=right | 1.2 km || 
|-id=030 bgcolor=#d6d6d6
| 614030 ||  || — || September 3, 2008 || Kitt Peak || Spacewatch ||  || align=right | 1.7 km || 
|-id=031 bgcolor=#C2FFFF
| 614031 ||  || — || September 3, 2008 || Kitt Peak || Spacewatch || L4 || align=right | 8.5 km || 
|-id=032 bgcolor=#d6d6d6
| 614032 ||  || — || September 4, 2008 || Kitt Peak || Spacewatch || KOR || align=right | 1.3 km || 
|-id=033 bgcolor=#E9E9E9
| 614033 ||  || — || September 4, 2008 || Kitt Peak || Spacewatch ||  || align=right | 1.5 km || 
|-id=034 bgcolor=#d6d6d6
| 614034 ||  || — || September 4, 2008 || Kitt Peak || Spacewatch ||  || align=right | 2.4 km || 
|-id=035 bgcolor=#FA8072
| 614035 ||  || — || September 5, 2008 || Kitt Peak || Spacewatch ||  || align=right | 1.8 km || 
|-id=036 bgcolor=#C2FFFF
| 614036 ||  || — || September 5, 2008 || Kitt Peak || Spacewatch || L4 || align=right | 7.0 km || 
|-id=037 bgcolor=#d6d6d6
| 614037 ||  || — || September 5, 2008 || Kitt Peak || Spacewatch ||  || align=right | 2.3 km || 
|-id=038 bgcolor=#fefefe
| 614038 ||  || — || September 6, 2008 || Kitt Peak || Spacewatch ||  || align=right data-sort-value="0.69" | 690 m || 
|-id=039 bgcolor=#fefefe
| 614039 ||  || — || September 6, 2008 || Mount Lemmon || Mount Lemmon Survey || MAS || align=right data-sort-value="0.64" | 640 m || 
|-id=040 bgcolor=#E9E9E9
| 614040 ||  || — || September 3, 2008 || Kitt Peak || Spacewatch ||  || align=right | 1.1 km || 
|-id=041 bgcolor=#C2FFFF
| 614041 ||  || — || September 4, 2008 || Kitt Peak || Spacewatch || L4 || align=right | 6.1 km || 
|-id=042 bgcolor=#E9E9E9
| 614042 ||  || — || September 8, 2008 || Kitt Peak || Spacewatch ||  || align=right | 1.0 km || 
|-id=043 bgcolor=#fefefe
| 614043 ||  || — || September 2, 2008 || Kitt Peak || Spacewatch ||  || align=right data-sort-value="0.68" | 680 m || 
|-id=044 bgcolor=#C2FFFF
| 614044 ||  || — || September 3, 2008 || Kitt Peak || Spacewatch || L4 || align=right | 6.2 km || 
|-id=045 bgcolor=#C2FFFF
| 614045 ||  || — || September 6, 2008 || Kitt Peak || Spacewatch || L4 || align=right | 6.5 km || 
|-id=046 bgcolor=#d6d6d6
| 614046 ||  || — || September 4, 2008 || Kitt Peak || Spacewatch ||  || align=right | 1.8 km || 
|-id=047 bgcolor=#C2FFFF
| 614047 ||  || — || September 6, 2008 || Kitt Peak || Spacewatch || L4ERY || align=right | 7.4 km || 
|-id=048 bgcolor=#FA8072
| 614048 ||  || — || September 6, 2008 || Kitt Peak || Spacewatch ||  || align=right data-sort-value="0.45" | 450 m || 
|-id=049 bgcolor=#E9E9E9
| 614049 ||  || — || September 4, 2008 || Kitt Peak || Spacewatch ||  || align=right | 1.3 km || 
|-id=050 bgcolor=#E9E9E9
| 614050 ||  || — || September 5, 2008 || Kitt Peak || Spacewatch ||  || align=right | 1.1 km || 
|-id=051 bgcolor=#d6d6d6
| 614051 ||  || — || September 9, 2008 || Mount Lemmon || Mount Lemmon Survey ||  || align=right | 4.4 km || 
|-id=052 bgcolor=#E9E9E9
| 614052 ||  || — || September 22, 2008 || Goodricke-Pigott || R. A. Tucker ||  || align=right data-sort-value="0.90" | 900 m || 
|-id=053 bgcolor=#E9E9E9
| 614053 ||  || — || September 19, 2008 || Kitt Peak || Spacewatch ||  || align=right | 1.3 km || 
|-id=054 bgcolor=#fefefe
| 614054 ||  || — || September 19, 2008 || Kitt Peak || Spacewatch ||  || align=right data-sort-value="0.63" | 630 m || 
|-id=055 bgcolor=#fefefe
| 614055 ||  || — || September 20, 2008 || Kitt Peak || Spacewatch ||  || align=right data-sort-value="0.51" | 510 m || 
|-id=056 bgcolor=#E9E9E9
| 614056 ||  || — || September 20, 2008 || Mount Lemmon || Mount Lemmon Survey ||  || align=right | 1.0 km || 
|-id=057 bgcolor=#d6d6d6
| 614057 ||  || — || September 20, 2008 || Kitt Peak || Spacewatch || LUT || align=right | 2.8 km || 
|-id=058 bgcolor=#E9E9E9
| 614058 ||  || — || September 20, 2008 || Kitt Peak || Spacewatch ||  || align=right | 1.1 km || 
|-id=059 bgcolor=#d6d6d6
| 614059 ||  || — || September 20, 2008 || Kitt Peak || Spacewatch ||  || align=right | 3.3 km || 
|-id=060 bgcolor=#fefefe
| 614060 ||  || — || September 20, 2008 || Kitt Peak || Spacewatch || NYS || align=right data-sort-value="0.58" | 580 m || 
|-id=061 bgcolor=#fefefe
| 614061 ||  || — || September 20, 2008 || Kitt Peak || Spacewatch || MAS || align=right data-sort-value="0.52" | 520 m || 
|-id=062 bgcolor=#E9E9E9
| 614062 ||  || — || September 20, 2008 || Kitt Peak || Spacewatch ||  || align=right | 1.0 km || 
|-id=063 bgcolor=#E9E9E9
| 614063 ||  || — || September 20, 2008 || Mount Lemmon || Mount Lemmon Survey ||  || align=right | 1.4 km || 
|-id=064 bgcolor=#E9E9E9
| 614064 ||  || — || September 20, 2008 || Mount Lemmon || Mount Lemmon Survey ||  || align=right data-sort-value="0.92" | 920 m || 
|-id=065 bgcolor=#fefefe
| 614065 ||  || — || September 21, 2008 || Mount Lemmon || Mount Lemmon Survey ||  || align=right data-sort-value="0.53" | 530 m || 
|-id=066 bgcolor=#fefefe
| 614066 ||  || — || September 22, 2008 || Mount Lemmon || Mount Lemmon Survey ||  || align=right data-sort-value="0.65" | 650 m || 
|-id=067 bgcolor=#C2FFFF
| 614067 ||  || — || September 20, 2008 || Kitt Peak || Spacewatch || L4 || align=right | 6.4 km || 
|-id=068 bgcolor=#d6d6d6
| 614068 ||  || — || September 20, 2008 || Kitt Peak || Spacewatch ||  || align=right | 3.2 km || 
|-id=069 bgcolor=#E9E9E9
| 614069 ||  || — || September 21, 2008 || Kitt Peak || Spacewatch ||  || align=right data-sort-value="0.57" | 570 m || 
|-id=070 bgcolor=#E9E9E9
| 614070 ||  || — || September 21, 2008 || Kitt Peak || Spacewatch ||  || align=right | 1.3 km || 
|-id=071 bgcolor=#fefefe
| 614071 ||  || — || September 21, 2008 || Kitt Peak || Spacewatch || H || align=right data-sort-value="0.55" | 550 m || 
|-id=072 bgcolor=#E9E9E9
| 614072 ||  || — || September 21, 2008 || Kitt Peak || Spacewatch ||  || align=right | 1.2 km || 
|-id=073 bgcolor=#E9E9E9
| 614073 ||  || — || September 21, 2008 || Kitt Peak || Spacewatch ||  || align=right | 1.2 km || 
|-id=074 bgcolor=#E9E9E9
| 614074 ||  || — || September 21, 2008 || Kitt Peak || Spacewatch ||  || align=right | 1.7 km || 
|-id=075 bgcolor=#fefefe
| 614075 ||  || — || September 21, 2008 || Kitt Peak || Spacewatch ||  || align=right data-sort-value="0.56" | 560 m || 
|-id=076 bgcolor=#E9E9E9
| 614076 ||  || — || September 21, 2008 || Kitt Peak || Spacewatch || EUN || align=right | 1.1 km || 
|-id=077 bgcolor=#d6d6d6
| 614077 ||  || — || September 21, 2008 || Mount Lemmon || Mount Lemmon Survey || Tj (2.96) || align=right | 4.5 km || 
|-id=078 bgcolor=#fefefe
| 614078 ||  || — || September 22, 2008 || Mount Lemmon || Mount Lemmon Survey ||  || align=right data-sort-value="0.47" | 470 m || 
|-id=079 bgcolor=#fefefe
| 614079 ||  || — || September 22, 2008 || Mount Lemmon || Mount Lemmon Survey || MAS || align=right data-sort-value="0.53" | 530 m || 
|-id=080 bgcolor=#C2FFFF
| 614080 ||  || — || September 22, 2008 || Mount Lemmon || Mount Lemmon Survey || L4 || align=right | 6.6 km || 
|-id=081 bgcolor=#d6d6d6
| 614081 ||  || — || September 22, 2008 || Mount Lemmon || Mount Lemmon Survey ||  || align=right | 1.9 km || 
|-id=082 bgcolor=#fefefe
| 614082 ||  || — || September 22, 2008 || Mount Lemmon || Mount Lemmon Survey || MAS || align=right data-sort-value="0.47" | 470 m || 
|-id=083 bgcolor=#fefefe
| 614083 ||  || — || September 22, 2008 || Kitt Peak || Spacewatch ||  || align=right data-sort-value="0.81" | 810 m || 
|-id=084 bgcolor=#fefefe
| 614084 ||  || — || September 23, 2008 || Kitt Peak || Spacewatch || H || align=right data-sort-value="0.55" | 550 m || 
|-id=085 bgcolor=#E9E9E9
| 614085 ||  || — || September 24, 2008 || Catalina || CSS ||  || align=right data-sort-value="0.52" | 520 m || 
|-id=086 bgcolor=#E9E9E9
| 614086 ||  || — || September 24, 2008 || Mount Lemmon || Mount Lemmon Survey ||  || align=right data-sort-value="0.61" | 610 m || 
|-id=087 bgcolor=#E9E9E9
| 614087 ||  || — || September 21, 2008 || Catalina || CSS ||  || align=right | 1.2 km || 
|-id=088 bgcolor=#FFC2E0
| 614088 ||  || — || September 29, 2008 || Siding Spring || SSS || APO || align=right data-sort-value="0.47" | 470 m || 
|-id=089 bgcolor=#fefefe
| 614089 ||  || — || September 28, 2008 || Socorro || LINEAR ||  || align=right data-sort-value="0.70" | 700 m || 
|-id=090 bgcolor=#d6d6d6
| 614090 ||  || — || September 28, 2008 || Socorro || LINEAR ||  || align=right | 4.4 km || 
|-id=091 bgcolor=#E9E9E9
| 614091 ||  || — || September 28, 2008 || Socorro || LINEAR || BRU || align=right | 1.8 km || 
|-id=092 bgcolor=#fefefe
| 614092 ||  || — || September 28, 2008 || Socorro || LINEAR ||  || align=right data-sort-value="0.71" | 710 m || 
|-id=093 bgcolor=#d6d6d6
| 614093 ||  || — || September 21, 2008 || Mount Lemmon || Mount Lemmon Survey ||  || align=right | 1.5 km || 
|-id=094 bgcolor=#fefefe
| 614094 ||  || — || September 21, 2008 || Mount Lemmon || Mount Lemmon Survey ||  || align=right data-sort-value="0.82" | 820 m || 
|-id=095 bgcolor=#E9E9E9
| 614095 ||  || — || September 23, 2008 || Kitt Peak || Spacewatch ||  || align=right | 1.1 km || 
|-id=096 bgcolor=#E9E9E9
| 614096 ||  || — || September 24, 2008 || Kitt Peak || Spacewatch ||  || align=right | 1.0 km || 
|-id=097 bgcolor=#fefefe
| 614097 ||  || — || September 24, 2008 || Kitt Peak || Spacewatch || H || align=right data-sort-value="0.62" | 620 m || 
|-id=098 bgcolor=#fefefe
| 614098 ||  || — || September 25, 2008 || Kitt Peak || Spacewatch ||  || align=right data-sort-value="0.59" | 590 m || 
|-id=099 bgcolor=#fefefe
| 614099 ||  || — || September 25, 2008 || Kitt Peak || Spacewatch || NYS || align=right data-sort-value="0.69" | 690 m || 
|-id=100 bgcolor=#d6d6d6
| 614100 ||  || — || September 26, 2008 || Kitt Peak || Spacewatch ||  || align=right | 2.2 km || 
|}

614101–614200 

|-bgcolor=#fefefe
| 614101 ||  || — || September 26, 2008 || Kitt Peak || Spacewatch || NYS || align=right data-sort-value="0.54" | 540 m || 
|-id=102 bgcolor=#d6d6d6
| 614102 ||  || — || September 26, 2008 || Kitt Peak || Spacewatch || Tj (2.97) || align=right | 2.3 km || 
|-id=103 bgcolor=#E9E9E9
| 614103 ||  || — || September 26, 2008 || Kitt Peak || Spacewatch ||  || align=right | 1.2 km || 
|-id=104 bgcolor=#E9E9E9
| 614104 ||  || — || September 28, 2008 || Charleston || ARO ||  || align=right | 1.7 km || 
|-id=105 bgcolor=#fefefe
| 614105 ||  || — || September 28, 2008 || Mount Lemmon || Mount Lemmon Survey ||  || align=right data-sort-value="0.61" | 610 m || 
|-id=106 bgcolor=#d6d6d6
| 614106 ||  || — || September 29, 2008 || Mount Lemmon || Mount Lemmon Survey ||  || align=right | 1.6 km || 
|-id=107 bgcolor=#d6d6d6
| 614107 ||  || — || September 29, 2008 || Mount Lemmon || Mount Lemmon Survey ||  || align=right | 1.8 km || 
|-id=108 bgcolor=#d6d6d6
| 614108 ||  || — || September 29, 2008 || Catalina || CSS ||  || align=right | 2.3 km || 
|-id=109 bgcolor=#E9E9E9
| 614109 ||  || — || September 29, 2008 || Kitt Peak || Spacewatch ||  || align=right | 1.6 km || 
|-id=110 bgcolor=#fefefe
| 614110 ||  || — || September 29, 2008 || Kitt Peak || Spacewatch || MAS || align=right data-sort-value="0.73" | 730 m || 
|-id=111 bgcolor=#E9E9E9
| 614111 ||  || — || September 25, 2008 || Mount Lemmon || Mount Lemmon Survey ||  || align=right | 1.2 km || 
|-id=112 bgcolor=#fefefe
| 614112 ||  || — || September 21, 2008 || Kitt Peak || Spacewatch ||  || align=right data-sort-value="0.64" | 640 m || 
|-id=113 bgcolor=#d6d6d6
| 614113 ||  || — || September 23, 2008 || Kitt Peak || Spacewatch ||  || align=right | 2.1 km || 
|-id=114 bgcolor=#C2FFFF
| 614114 ||  || — || September 24, 2008 || Kitt Peak || Spacewatch || L4 || align=right | 6.2 km || 
|-id=115 bgcolor=#d6d6d6
| 614115 ||  || — || September 28, 2008 || Mount Lemmon || Mount Lemmon Survey || EOS || align=right | 1.7 km || 
|-id=116 bgcolor=#E9E9E9
| 614116 ||  || — || September 30, 2008 || Catalina || CSS ||  || align=right data-sort-value="0.88" | 880 m || 
|-id=117 bgcolor=#fefefe
| 614117 ||  || — || September 22, 2008 || Mount Lemmon || Mount Lemmon Survey ||  || align=right data-sort-value="0.44" | 440 m || 
|-id=118 bgcolor=#C2FFFF
| 614118 ||  || — || September 23, 2008 || Kitt Peak || Spacewatch || L4ERY || align=right | 6.5 km || 
|-id=119 bgcolor=#C2FFFF
| 614119 ||  || — || September 23, 2008 || Mount Lemmon || Mount Lemmon Survey || L4ERY || align=right | 6.7 km || 
|-id=120 bgcolor=#C2FFFF
| 614120 ||  || — || September 23, 2008 || Mount Lemmon || Mount Lemmon Survey || L4 || align=right | 7.0 km || 
|-id=121 bgcolor=#C2FFFF
| 614121 ||  || — || September 23, 2008 || Mount Lemmon || Mount Lemmon Survey || L4 || align=right | 6.8 km || 
|-id=122 bgcolor=#C2FFFF
| 614122 ||  || — || September 24, 2008 || Mount Lemmon || Mount Lemmon Survey || L4 || align=right | 7.1 km || 
|-id=123 bgcolor=#fefefe
| 614123 ||  || — || September 19, 2008 || Kitt Peak || Spacewatch ||  || align=right data-sort-value="0.57" | 570 m || 
|-id=124 bgcolor=#d6d6d6
| 614124 ||  || — || September 19, 2008 || Kitt Peak || Spacewatch || THM || align=right | 1.6 km || 
|-id=125 bgcolor=#fefefe
| 614125 ||  || — || September 29, 2008 || Mount Lemmon || Mount Lemmon Survey ||  || align=right data-sort-value="0.71" | 710 m || 
|-id=126 bgcolor=#fefefe
| 614126 ||  || — || September 22, 2008 || Mount Lemmon || Mount Lemmon Survey ||  || align=right data-sort-value="0.62" | 620 m || 
|-id=127 bgcolor=#E9E9E9
| 614127 ||  || — || September 22, 2008 || Mount Lemmon || Mount Lemmon Survey ||  || align=right | 2.1 km || 
|-id=128 bgcolor=#E9E9E9
| 614128 ||  || — || September 26, 2008 || Kitt Peak || Spacewatch || AGN || align=right data-sort-value="0.93" | 930 m || 
|-id=129 bgcolor=#d6d6d6
| 614129 ||  || — || September 22, 2008 || Kitt Peak || Spacewatch ||  || align=right | 3.6 km || 
|-id=130 bgcolor=#fefefe
| 614130 ||  || — || September 24, 2008 || Mount Lemmon || Mount Lemmon Survey ||  || align=right data-sort-value="0.63" | 630 m || 
|-id=131 bgcolor=#d6d6d6
| 614131 ||  || — || September 24, 2008 || Kitt Peak || Spacewatch ||  || align=right | 2.1 km || 
|-id=132 bgcolor=#d6d6d6
| 614132 ||  || — || October 1, 2008 || Socorro || LINEAR ||  || align=right | 2.0 km || 
|-id=133 bgcolor=#d6d6d6
| 614133 ||  || — || October 1, 2008 || Mount Lemmon || Mount Lemmon Survey ||  || align=right | 2.4 km || 
|-id=134 bgcolor=#FFC2E0
| 614134 ||  || — || October 7, 2008 || Socorro || LINEAR || ATEPHA || align=right data-sort-value="0.17" | 170 m || 
|-id=135 bgcolor=#fefefe
| 614135 ||  || — || October 1, 2008 || La Sagra || OAM Obs. ||  || align=right data-sort-value="0.57" | 570 m || 
|-id=136 bgcolor=#E9E9E9
| 614136 ||  || — || October 1, 2008 || La Sagra || OAM Obs. ||  || align=right data-sort-value="0.95" | 950 m || 
|-id=137 bgcolor=#E9E9E9
| 614137 ||  || — || October 8, 2008 || Tzec Maun || E. Schwab ||  || align=right | 1.1 km || 
|-id=138 bgcolor=#fefefe
| 614138 ||  || — || October 1, 2008 || Mount Lemmon || Mount Lemmon Survey ||  || align=right data-sort-value="0.76" | 760 m || 
|-id=139 bgcolor=#E9E9E9
| 614139 ||  || — || October 1, 2008 || Mount Lemmon || Mount Lemmon Survey ||  || align=right | 1.1 km || 
|-id=140 bgcolor=#E9E9E9
| 614140 ||  || — || October 1, 2008 || Mount Lemmon || Mount Lemmon Survey || HNS || align=right data-sort-value="0.85" | 850 m || 
|-id=141 bgcolor=#E9E9E9
| 614141 ||  || — || October 1, 2008 || Mount Lemmon || Mount Lemmon Survey ||  || align=right data-sort-value="0.71" | 710 m || 
|-id=142 bgcolor=#E9E9E9
| 614142 ||  || — || October 1, 2008 || Kitt Peak || Spacewatch ||  || align=right | 1.3 km || 
|-id=143 bgcolor=#E9E9E9
| 614143 ||  || — || October 1, 2008 || La Sagra || OAM Obs. ||  || align=right | 1.1 km || 
|-id=144 bgcolor=#fefefe
| 614144 ||  || — || October 1, 2008 || Kitt Peak || Spacewatch || MAS || align=right data-sort-value="0.56" | 560 m || 
|-id=145 bgcolor=#C2FFFF
| 614145 ||  || — || October 1, 2008 || Mount Lemmon || Mount Lemmon Survey || L4 || align=right | 9.2 km || 
|-id=146 bgcolor=#d6d6d6
| 614146 ||  || — || October 1, 2008 || Kitt Peak || Spacewatch ||  || align=right | 3.5 km || 
|-id=147 bgcolor=#fefefe
| 614147 ||  || — || October 1, 2008 || Kitt Peak || Spacewatch || NYS || align=right data-sort-value="0.54" | 540 m || 
|-id=148 bgcolor=#fefefe
| 614148 ||  || — || October 1, 2008 || Kitt Peak || Spacewatch || NYS || align=right data-sort-value="0.43" | 430 m || 
|-id=149 bgcolor=#d6d6d6
| 614149 ||  || — || October 1, 2008 || Mount Lemmon || Mount Lemmon Survey ||  || align=right | 2.2 km || 
|-id=150 bgcolor=#fefefe
| 614150 ||  || — || October 2, 2008 || Kitt Peak || Spacewatch ||  || align=right data-sort-value="0.60" | 600 m || 
|-id=151 bgcolor=#E9E9E9
| 614151 ||  || — || October 2, 2008 || Kitt Peak || Spacewatch ||  || align=right | 1.1 km || 
|-id=152 bgcolor=#fefefe
| 614152 ||  || — || October 2, 2008 || Kitt Peak || Spacewatch || MAS || align=right data-sort-value="0.56" | 560 m || 
|-id=153 bgcolor=#fefefe
| 614153 ||  || — || October 2, 2008 || Mount Lemmon || Mount Lemmon Survey ||  || align=right data-sort-value="0.50" | 500 m || 
|-id=154 bgcolor=#d6d6d6
| 614154 ||  || — || October 2, 2008 || Mount Lemmon || Mount Lemmon Survey ||  || align=right | 2.5 km || 
|-id=155 bgcolor=#E9E9E9
| 614155 ||  || — || October 3, 2008 || Kitt Peak || Spacewatch ||  || align=right data-sort-value="0.57" | 570 m || 
|-id=156 bgcolor=#d6d6d6
| 614156 ||  || — || October 3, 2008 || Kitt Peak || Spacewatch || TIR || align=right | 1.9 km || 
|-id=157 bgcolor=#fefefe
| 614157 ||  || — || October 6, 2008 || Kitt Peak || Spacewatch ||  || align=right data-sort-value="0.53" | 530 m || 
|-id=158 bgcolor=#E9E9E9
| 614158 ||  || — || October 6, 2008 || Kitt Peak || Spacewatch ||  || align=right | 1.3 km || 
|-id=159 bgcolor=#fefefe
| 614159 ||  || — || October 8, 2008 || Catalina || CSS || MAS || align=right data-sort-value="0.63" | 630 m || 
|-id=160 bgcolor=#fefefe
| 614160 ||  || — || October 8, 2008 || Mount Lemmon || Mount Lemmon Survey ||  || align=right data-sort-value="0.53" | 530 m || 
|-id=161 bgcolor=#d6d6d6
| 614161 ||  || — || October 8, 2008 || Kitt Peak || Spacewatch || TEL || align=right data-sort-value="0.93" | 930 m || 
|-id=162 bgcolor=#fefefe
| 614162 ||  || — || October 8, 2008 || Kitt Peak || Spacewatch ||  || align=right data-sort-value="0.68" | 680 m || 
|-id=163 bgcolor=#d6d6d6
| 614163 ||  || — || October 8, 2008 || Kitt Peak || Spacewatch ||  || align=right | 3.1 km || 
|-id=164 bgcolor=#fefefe
| 614164 ||  || — || October 8, 2008 || Kitt Peak || Spacewatch || MAS || align=right data-sort-value="0.53" | 530 m || 
|-id=165 bgcolor=#fefefe
| 614165 ||  || — || October 8, 2008 || Kitt Peak || Spacewatch ||  || align=right data-sort-value="0.68" | 680 m || 
|-id=166 bgcolor=#fefefe
| 614166 ||  || — || October 8, 2008 || Mount Lemmon || Mount Lemmon Survey ||  || align=right data-sort-value="0.63" | 630 m || 
|-id=167 bgcolor=#d6d6d6
| 614167 ||  || — || October 9, 2008 || Mount Lemmon || Mount Lemmon Survey ||  || align=right | 3.3 km || 
|-id=168 bgcolor=#E9E9E9
| 614168 ||  || — || October 6, 2008 || Catalina || CSS ||  || align=right data-sort-value="0.93" | 930 m || 
|-id=169 bgcolor=#fefefe
| 614169 ||  || — || October 1, 2008 || Kitt Peak || Spacewatch ||  || align=right data-sort-value="0.70" | 700 m || 
|-id=170 bgcolor=#fefefe
| 614170 ||  || — || October 6, 2008 || Catalina || CSS || H || align=right data-sort-value="0.72" | 720 m || 
|-id=171 bgcolor=#d6d6d6
| 614171 ||  || — || October 6, 2008 || Mount Lemmon || Mount Lemmon Survey ||  || align=right | 2.0 km || 
|-id=172 bgcolor=#fefefe
| 614172 ||  || — || October 9, 2008 || Kitt Peak || Spacewatch ||  || align=right data-sort-value="0.54" | 540 m || 
|-id=173 bgcolor=#fefefe
| 614173 ||  || — || October 3, 2008 || Mount Lemmon || Mount Lemmon Survey || NYS || align=right data-sort-value="0.50" | 500 m || 
|-id=174 bgcolor=#E9E9E9
| 614174 ||  || — || October 2, 2008 || Kitt Peak || Spacewatch ||  || align=right data-sort-value="0.56" | 560 m || 
|-id=175 bgcolor=#E9E9E9
| 614175 ||  || — || October 8, 2008 || Kitt Peak || Spacewatch ||  || align=right | 1.0 km || 
|-id=176 bgcolor=#fefefe
| 614176 ||  || — || October 8, 2008 || Kitt Peak || Spacewatch ||  || align=right data-sort-value="0.53" | 530 m || 
|-id=177 bgcolor=#fefefe
| 614177 ||  || — || October 17, 2008 || Kitt Peak || Spacewatch || NYS || align=right data-sort-value="0.43" | 430 m || 
|-id=178 bgcolor=#d6d6d6
| 614178 ||  || — || October 17, 2008 || Kitt Peak || Spacewatch ||  || align=right | 2.0 km || 
|-id=179 bgcolor=#fefefe
| 614179 ||  || — || October 17, 2008 || Kitt Peak || Spacewatch || SUL || align=right | 1.6 km || 
|-id=180 bgcolor=#E9E9E9
| 614180 ||  || — || October 19, 2008 || Kitt Peak || Spacewatch ||  || align=right | 1.4 km || 
|-id=181 bgcolor=#fefefe
| 614181 ||  || — || October 19, 2008 || Kitt Peak || Spacewatch ||  || align=right data-sort-value="0.37" | 370 m || 
|-id=182 bgcolor=#E9E9E9
| 614182 ||  || — || October 20, 2008 || Kitt Peak || Spacewatch || KON || align=right | 1.4 km || 
|-id=183 bgcolor=#fefefe
| 614183 ||  || — || October 20, 2008 || Kitt Peak || Spacewatch ||  || align=right data-sort-value="0.65" | 650 m || 
|-id=184 bgcolor=#fefefe
| 614184 ||  || — || October 20, 2008 || Kitt Peak || Spacewatch ||  || align=right data-sort-value="0.72" | 720 m || 
|-id=185 bgcolor=#fefefe
| 614185 ||  || — || October 20, 2008 || Kitt Peak || Spacewatch || MAS || align=right data-sort-value="0.58" | 580 m || 
|-id=186 bgcolor=#d6d6d6
| 614186 ||  || — || October 20, 2008 || Kitt Peak || Spacewatch ||  || align=right | 1.9 km || 
|-id=187 bgcolor=#d6d6d6
| 614187 ||  || — || October 20, 2008 || Kitt Peak || Spacewatch ||  || align=right | 3.0 km || 
|-id=188 bgcolor=#d6d6d6
| 614188 ||  || — || October 20, 2008 || Kitt Peak || Spacewatch ||  || align=right | 2.4 km || 
|-id=189 bgcolor=#d6d6d6
| 614189 ||  || — || October 20, 2008 || Kitt Peak || Spacewatch ||  || align=right | 2.2 km || 
|-id=190 bgcolor=#fefefe
| 614190 ||  || — || October 20, 2008 || Kitt Peak || Spacewatch ||  || align=right data-sort-value="0.70" | 700 m || 
|-id=191 bgcolor=#fefefe
| 614191 ||  || — || October 20, 2008 || Kitt Peak || Spacewatch ||  || align=right data-sort-value="0.58" | 580 m || 
|-id=192 bgcolor=#d6d6d6
| 614192 ||  || — || October 20, 2008 || Mount Lemmon || Mount Lemmon Survey ||  || align=right | 2.0 km || 
|-id=193 bgcolor=#E9E9E9
| 614193 ||  || — || October 20, 2008 || Kitt Peak || Spacewatch || (1547) || align=right | 1.3 km || 
|-id=194 bgcolor=#fefefe
| 614194 ||  || — || October 20, 2008 || Kitt Peak || Spacewatch || MAS || align=right data-sort-value="0.54" | 540 m || 
|-id=195 bgcolor=#d6d6d6
| 614195 ||  || — || October 20, 2008 || Kitt Peak || Spacewatch ||  || align=right | 3.5 km || 
|-id=196 bgcolor=#fefefe
| 614196 ||  || — || October 20, 2008 || Mount Lemmon || Mount Lemmon Survey || NYS || align=right data-sort-value="0.50" | 500 m || 
|-id=197 bgcolor=#d6d6d6
| 614197 ||  || — || October 20, 2008 || Mount Lemmon || Mount Lemmon Survey ||  || align=right | 3.0 km || 
|-id=198 bgcolor=#d6d6d6
| 614198 ||  || — || October 20, 2008 || Kitt Peak || Spacewatch ||  || align=right | 2.4 km || 
|-id=199 bgcolor=#d6d6d6
| 614199 ||  || — || October 20, 2008 || Kitt Peak || Spacewatch ||  || align=right | 3.0 km || 
|-id=200 bgcolor=#E9E9E9
| 614200 ||  || — || October 21, 2008 || Kitt Peak || Spacewatch ||  || align=right | 1.3 km || 
|}

614201–614300 

|-bgcolor=#d6d6d6
| 614201 ||  || — || October 21, 2008 || Kitt Peak || Spacewatch ||  || align=right | 3.7 km || 
|-id=202 bgcolor=#d6d6d6
| 614202 ||  || — || October 22, 2008 || Kitt Peak || Spacewatch ||  || align=right | 4.1 km || 
|-id=203 bgcolor=#d6d6d6
| 614203 ||  || — || October 22, 2008 || Kitt Peak || Spacewatch ||  || align=right | 2.7 km || 
|-id=204 bgcolor=#E9E9E9
| 614204 ||  || — || October 22, 2008 || Kitt Peak || Spacewatch ||  || align=right | 1.1 km || 
|-id=205 bgcolor=#d6d6d6
| 614205 ||  || — || October 21, 2008 || Kitt Peak || Spacewatch || THM || align=right | 1.6 km || 
|-id=206 bgcolor=#fefefe
| 614206 ||  || — || October 22, 2008 || Kitt Peak || Spacewatch ||  || align=right data-sort-value="0.63" | 630 m || 
|-id=207 bgcolor=#d6d6d6
| 614207 ||  || — || October 22, 2008 || Kitt Peak || Spacewatch ||  || align=right | 2.7 km || 
|-id=208 bgcolor=#d6d6d6
| 614208 ||  || — || October 22, 2008 || Kitt Peak || Spacewatch ||  || align=right | 3.7 km || 
|-id=209 bgcolor=#d6d6d6
| 614209 ||  || — || October 22, 2008 || Kitt Peak || Spacewatch || EOS || align=right | 4.0 km || 
|-id=210 bgcolor=#fefefe
| 614210 ||  || — || October 22, 2008 || Kitt Peak || Spacewatch ||  || align=right data-sort-value="0.91" | 910 m || 
|-id=211 bgcolor=#fefefe
| 614211 ||  || — || October 23, 2008 || Kitt Peak || Spacewatch || NYS || align=right data-sort-value="0.53" | 530 m || 
|-id=212 bgcolor=#E9E9E9
| 614212 ||  || — || October 23, 2008 || Kitt Peak || Spacewatch ||  || align=right | 1.6 km || 
|-id=213 bgcolor=#E9E9E9
| 614213 ||  || — || October 23, 2008 || Kitt Peak || Spacewatch ||  || align=right | 1.3 km || 
|-id=214 bgcolor=#fefefe
| 614214 ||  || — || October 23, 2008 || Kitt Peak || Spacewatch || H || align=right data-sort-value="0.40" | 400 m || 
|-id=215 bgcolor=#E9E9E9
| 614215 ||  || — || October 23, 2008 || Kitt Peak || Spacewatch || JUN || align=right data-sort-value="0.64" | 640 m || 
|-id=216 bgcolor=#fefefe
| 614216 ||  || — || October 23, 2008 || Kitt Peak || Spacewatch || NYS || align=right data-sort-value="0.53" | 530 m || 
|-id=217 bgcolor=#d6d6d6
| 614217 ||  || — || October 24, 2008 || Kitt Peak || Spacewatch || EOS || align=right | 1.3 km || 
|-id=218 bgcolor=#fefefe
| 614218 ||  || — || October 24, 2008 || Catalina || CSS ||  || align=right data-sort-value="0.57" | 570 m || 
|-id=219 bgcolor=#E9E9E9
| 614219 ||  || — || October 24, 2008 || Kitt Peak || Spacewatch ||  || align=right | 1.5 km || 
|-id=220 bgcolor=#fefefe
| 614220 ||  || — || October 24, 2008 || Kitt Peak || Spacewatch || NYS || align=right data-sort-value="0.56" | 560 m || 
|-id=221 bgcolor=#d6d6d6
| 614221 ||  || — || October 24, 2008 || Kitt Peak || Spacewatch ||  || align=right | 3.8 km || 
|-id=222 bgcolor=#E9E9E9
| 614222 ||  || — || October 24, 2008 || Catalina || CSS ||  || align=right data-sort-value="0.92" | 920 m || 
|-id=223 bgcolor=#E9E9E9
| 614223 ||  || — || October 25, 2008 || Kitt Peak || Spacewatch ||  || align=right | 1.1 km || 
|-id=224 bgcolor=#d6d6d6
| 614224 ||  || — || October 26, 2008 || Kitt Peak || Spacewatch ||  || align=right | 2.5 km || 
|-id=225 bgcolor=#d6d6d6
| 614225 ||  || — || October 27, 2008 || Catalina || CSS ||  || align=right | 2.9 km || 
|-id=226 bgcolor=#fefefe
| 614226 ||  || — || October 23, 2008 || Kitt Peak || Spacewatch ||  || align=right data-sort-value="0.59" | 590 m || 
|-id=227 bgcolor=#fefefe
| 614227 ||  || — || October 25, 2008 || Kitt Peak || Spacewatch ||  || align=right data-sort-value="0.73" | 730 m || 
|-id=228 bgcolor=#E9E9E9
| 614228 ||  || — || October 25, 2008 || Mount Lemmon || Mount Lemmon Survey ||  || align=right | 1.8 km || 
|-id=229 bgcolor=#fefefe
| 614229 ||  || — || October 25, 2008 || Kitt Peak || Spacewatch || NYS || align=right data-sort-value="0.53" | 530 m || 
|-id=230 bgcolor=#d6d6d6
| 614230 ||  || — || October 26, 2008 || Mount Lemmon || Mount Lemmon Survey ||  || align=right | 2.6 km || 
|-id=231 bgcolor=#E9E9E9
| 614231 ||  || — || October 26, 2008 || Mount Lemmon || Mount Lemmon Survey ||  || align=right data-sort-value="0.83" | 830 m || 
|-id=232 bgcolor=#fefefe
| 614232 ||  || — || October 27, 2008 || Kitt Peak || Spacewatch || MAS || align=right data-sort-value="0.51" | 510 m || 
|-id=233 bgcolor=#fefefe
| 614233 ||  || — || October 27, 2008 || Mount Lemmon || Mount Lemmon Survey || H || align=right data-sort-value="0.54" | 540 m || 
|-id=234 bgcolor=#fefefe
| 614234 ||  || — || October 27, 2008 || Kitt Peak || Spacewatch ||  || align=right data-sort-value="0.70" | 700 m || 
|-id=235 bgcolor=#fefefe
| 614235 ||  || — || October 28, 2008 || Kitt Peak || Spacewatch ||  || align=right data-sort-value="0.72" | 720 m || 
|-id=236 bgcolor=#E9E9E9
| 614236 ||  || — || October 28, 2008 || Kitt Peak || Spacewatch ||  || align=right | 1.3 km || 
|-id=237 bgcolor=#fefefe
| 614237 ||  || — || October 28, 2008 || Mount Lemmon || Mount Lemmon Survey || MAS || align=right data-sort-value="0.46" | 460 m || 
|-id=238 bgcolor=#fefefe
| 614238 ||  || — || October 28, 2008 || Kitt Peak || Spacewatch || MAS || align=right data-sort-value="0.70" | 700 m || 
|-id=239 bgcolor=#d6d6d6
| 614239 ||  || — || October 28, 2008 || Mount Lemmon || Mount Lemmon Survey ||  || align=right | 2.3 km || 
|-id=240 bgcolor=#fefefe
| 614240 ||  || — || October 28, 2008 || Mount Lemmon || Mount Lemmon Survey || MAS || align=right data-sort-value="0.58" | 580 m || 
|-id=241 bgcolor=#fefefe
| 614241 ||  || — || October 29, 2008 || Kitt Peak || Spacewatch || NYS || align=right data-sort-value="0.63" | 630 m || 
|-id=242 bgcolor=#d6d6d6
| 614242 ||  || — || October 29, 2008 || Kitt Peak || Spacewatch || EUP || align=right | 3.8 km || 
|-id=243 bgcolor=#E9E9E9
| 614243 ||  || — || October 29, 2008 || Kitt Peak || Spacewatch ||  || align=right | 1.1 km || 
|-id=244 bgcolor=#d6d6d6
| 614244 ||  || — || October 29, 2008 || Kitt Peak || Spacewatch ||  || align=right | 1.5 km || 
|-id=245 bgcolor=#d6d6d6
| 614245 ||  || — || October 29, 2008 || Kitt Peak || Spacewatch ||  || align=right | 3.1 km || 
|-id=246 bgcolor=#fefefe
| 614246 ||  || — || October 29, 2008 || Mount Lemmon || Mount Lemmon Survey ||  || align=right data-sort-value="0.47" | 470 m || 
|-id=247 bgcolor=#fefefe
| 614247 ||  || — || October 30, 2008 || Kitt Peak || Spacewatch ||  || align=right data-sort-value="0.59" | 590 m || 
|-id=248 bgcolor=#d6d6d6
| 614248 ||  || — || October 30, 2008 || Kitt Peak || Spacewatch || EOS || align=right | 1.6 km || 
|-id=249 bgcolor=#fefefe
| 614249 ||  || — || October 30, 2008 || Kitt Peak || Spacewatch ||  || align=right data-sort-value="0.53" | 530 m || 
|-id=250 bgcolor=#E9E9E9
| 614250 ||  || — || October 30, 2008 || Kitt Peak || Spacewatch || AEO || align=right data-sort-value="0.91" | 910 m || 
|-id=251 bgcolor=#E9E9E9
| 614251 ||  || — || October 31, 2008 || Kitt Peak || Spacewatch ||  || align=right | 1.2 km || 
|-id=252 bgcolor=#fefefe
| 614252 ||  || — || October 20, 2008 || Kitt Peak || Spacewatch || CLA || align=right | 1.2 km || 
|-id=253 bgcolor=#fefefe
| 614253 ||  || — || October 20, 2008 || Kitt Peak || Spacewatch ||  || align=right data-sort-value="0.44" | 440 m || 
|-id=254 bgcolor=#fefefe
| 614254 ||  || — || October 20, 2008 || Kitt Peak || Spacewatch ||  || align=right data-sort-value="0.59" | 590 m || 
|-id=255 bgcolor=#fefefe
| 614255 ||  || — || October 22, 2008 || Kitt Peak || Spacewatch ||  || align=right data-sort-value="0.68" | 680 m || 
|-id=256 bgcolor=#d6d6d6
| 614256 ||  || — || October 25, 2008 || Mount Lemmon || Mount Lemmon Survey ||  || align=right | 2.7 km || 
|-id=257 bgcolor=#fefefe
| 614257 ||  || — || October 21, 2008 || Kitt Peak || Spacewatch ||  || align=right data-sort-value="0.71" | 710 m || 
|-id=258 bgcolor=#d6d6d6
| 614258 ||  || — || October 26, 2008 || Mount Lemmon || Mount Lemmon Survey ||  || align=right | 2.3 km || 
|-id=259 bgcolor=#E9E9E9
| 614259 ||  || — || October 27, 2008 || Kitt Peak || Spacewatch ||  || align=right | 1.5 km || 
|-id=260 bgcolor=#d6d6d6
| 614260 ||  || — || October 27, 2008 || Mount Lemmon || Mount Lemmon Survey ||  || align=right | 3.1 km || 
|-id=261 bgcolor=#fefefe
| 614261 ||  || — || October 23, 2008 || Mount Lemmon || Mount Lemmon Survey ||  || align=right data-sort-value="0.47" | 470 m || 
|-id=262 bgcolor=#d6d6d6
| 614262 ||  || — || October 24, 2008 || Catalina || CSS || EUP || align=right | 4.1 km || 
|-id=263 bgcolor=#d6d6d6
| 614263 ||  || — || October 28, 2008 || Catalina || CSS ||  || align=right | 2.9 km || 
|-id=264 bgcolor=#fefefe
| 614264 ||  || — || October 23, 2008 || Mount Lemmon || Mount Lemmon Survey ||  || align=right data-sort-value="0.50" | 500 m || 
|-id=265 bgcolor=#d6d6d6
| 614265 ||  || — || October 28, 2008 || Kitt Peak || Spacewatch || 7:4* || align=right | 1.6 km || 
|-id=266 bgcolor=#FFC2E0
| 614266 ||  || — || November 1, 2008 || Socorro || LINEAR || AMO +1km || align=right | 1.4 km || 
|-id=267 bgcolor=#d6d6d6
| 614267 ||  || — || November 1, 2008 || Mount Lemmon || Mount Lemmon Survey ||  || align=right | 2.3 km || 
|-id=268 bgcolor=#fefefe
| 614268 ||  || — || November 1, 2008 || Mount Lemmon || Mount Lemmon Survey || NYS || align=right data-sort-value="0.47" | 470 m || 
|-id=269 bgcolor=#d6d6d6
| 614269 ||  || — || November 1, 2008 || Kitt Peak || Spacewatch ||  || align=right | 2.7 km || 
|-id=270 bgcolor=#E9E9E9
| 614270 ||  || — || November 4, 2008 || Kitt Peak || Spacewatch ||  || align=right data-sort-value="0.65" | 650 m || 
|-id=271 bgcolor=#d6d6d6
| 614271 ||  || — || November 6, 2008 || Mount Lemmon || Mount Lemmon Survey ||  || align=right | 2.5 km || 
|-id=272 bgcolor=#d6d6d6
| 614272 ||  || — || November 8, 2008 || Mount Lemmon || Mount Lemmon Survey || THM || align=right | 1.9 km || 
|-id=273 bgcolor=#d6d6d6
| 614273 ||  || — || November 7, 2008 || Mount Lemmon || Mount Lemmon Survey ||  || align=right | 2.9 km || 
|-id=274 bgcolor=#fefefe
| 614274 ||  || — || November 17, 2008 || Kitt Peak || Spacewatch || NYS || align=right data-sort-value="0.56" | 560 m || 
|-id=275 bgcolor=#E9E9E9
| 614275 ||  || — || November 17, 2008 || Kitt Peak || Spacewatch ||  || align=right data-sort-value="0.68" | 680 m || 
|-id=276 bgcolor=#E9E9E9
| 614276 ||  || — || November 18, 2008 || Catalina || CSS ||  || align=right | 1.2 km || 
|-id=277 bgcolor=#d6d6d6
| 614277 ||  || — || November 17, 2008 || Kitt Peak || Spacewatch ||  || align=right | 2.5 km || 
|-id=278 bgcolor=#d6d6d6
| 614278 ||  || — || November 17, 2008 || Kitt Peak || Spacewatch || THM || align=right | 2.0 km || 
|-id=279 bgcolor=#fefefe
| 614279 ||  || — || November 18, 2008 || Kitt Peak || Spacewatch ||  || align=right data-sort-value="0.60" | 600 m || 
|-id=280 bgcolor=#d6d6d6
| 614280 ||  || — || November 19, 2008 || Mount Lemmon || Mount Lemmon Survey || THM || align=right | 1.5 km || 
|-id=281 bgcolor=#d6d6d6
| 614281 ||  || — || November 19, 2008 || Kitt Peak || Spacewatch ||  || align=right | 4.6 km || 
|-id=282 bgcolor=#fefefe
| 614282 ||  || — || November 19, 2008 || Mount Lemmon || Mount Lemmon Survey ||  || align=right data-sort-value="0.60" | 600 m || 
|-id=283 bgcolor=#fefefe
| 614283 ||  || — || November 19, 2008 || Mount Lemmon || Mount Lemmon Survey ||  || align=right data-sort-value="0.62" | 620 m || 
|-id=284 bgcolor=#fefefe
| 614284 ||  || — || November 17, 2008 || Kitt Peak || Spacewatch ||  || align=right data-sort-value="0.79" | 790 m || 
|-id=285 bgcolor=#fefefe
| 614285 ||  || — || November 17, 2008 || Kitt Peak || Spacewatch ||  || align=right data-sort-value="0.63" | 630 m || 
|-id=286 bgcolor=#fefefe
| 614286 ||  || — || November 18, 2008 || Kitt Peak || Spacewatch ||  || align=right data-sort-value="0.77" | 770 m || 
|-id=287 bgcolor=#E9E9E9
| 614287 ||  || — || November 19, 2008 || Mount Lemmon || Mount Lemmon Survey ||  || align=right | 1.3 km || 
|-id=288 bgcolor=#E9E9E9
| 614288 ||  || — || November 20, 2008 || Kitt Peak || Spacewatch ||  || align=right | 1.5 km || 
|-id=289 bgcolor=#fefefe
| 614289 ||  || — || November 20, 2008 || Kitt Peak || Spacewatch ||  || align=right data-sort-value="0.67" | 670 m || 
|-id=290 bgcolor=#fefefe
| 614290 ||  || — || November 21, 2008 || Mount Lemmon || Mount Lemmon Survey ||  || align=right data-sort-value="0.51" | 510 m || 
|-id=291 bgcolor=#E9E9E9
| 614291 ||  || — || November 28, 2008 || Sierra Stars || W. G. Dillon, D. Wells ||  || align=right data-sort-value="0.64" | 640 m || 
|-id=292 bgcolor=#d6d6d6
| 614292 ||  || — || November 18, 2008 || Catalina || CSS ||  || align=right | 5.8 km || 
|-id=293 bgcolor=#d6d6d6
| 614293 ||  || — || November 19, 2008 || Catalina || CSS ||  || align=right | 1.8 km || 
|-id=294 bgcolor=#fefefe
| 614294 ||  || — || November 23, 2008 || La Sagra || OAM Obs. || NYS || align=right data-sort-value="0.64" | 640 m || 
|-id=295 bgcolor=#E9E9E9
| 614295 ||  || — || November 19, 2008 || Kitt Peak || Spacewatch ||  || align=right | 1.3 km || 
|-id=296 bgcolor=#fefefe
| 614296 ||  || — || November 26, 2008 || La Sagra || OAM Obs. ||  || align=right data-sort-value="0.62" | 620 m || 
|-id=297 bgcolor=#d6d6d6
| 614297 ||  || — || December 2, 2008 || Socorro || LINEAR ||  || align=right | 4.5 km || 
|-id=298 bgcolor=#fefefe
| 614298 ||  || — || December 4, 2008 || Socorro || LINEAR || PHO || align=right data-sort-value="0.96" | 960 m || 
|-id=299 bgcolor=#d6d6d6
| 614299 ||  || — || December 4, 2008 || Mount Lemmon || Mount Lemmon Survey ||  || align=right | 2.7 km || 
|-id=300 bgcolor=#d6d6d6
| 614300 ||  || — || December 2, 2008 || Kitt Peak || Spacewatch ||  || align=right | 2.5 km || 
|}

614301–614400 

|-bgcolor=#fefefe
| 614301 ||  || — || December 2, 2008 || Kitt Peak || Spacewatch ||  || align=right data-sort-value="0.78" | 780 m || 
|-id=302 bgcolor=#E9E9E9
| 614302 ||  || — || December 2, 2008 || Kitt Peak || Spacewatch ||  || align=right | 1.4 km || 
|-id=303 bgcolor=#d6d6d6
| 614303 ||  || — || December 3, 2008 || Kitt Peak || Spacewatch || EUP || align=right | 4.8 km || 
|-id=304 bgcolor=#d6d6d6
| 614304 ||  || — || December 4, 2008 || Mount Lemmon || Mount Lemmon Survey || TIR || align=right | 3.3 km || 
|-id=305 bgcolor=#E9E9E9
| 614305 ||  || — || December 4, 2008 || Kitt Peak || Spacewatch || EUN || align=right | 1.2 km || 
|-id=306 bgcolor=#d6d6d6
| 614306 ||  || — || December 19, 2008 || Calar Alto || F. Hormuth ||  || align=right | 3.2 km || 
|-id=307 bgcolor=#d6d6d6
| 614307 ||  || — || December 21, 2008 || Calar Alto || F. Hormuth || EOS || align=right | 1.6 km || 
|-id=308 bgcolor=#E9E9E9
| 614308 ||  || — || December 23, 2008 || Piszkesteto || K. Sárneczky ||  || align=right data-sort-value="0.98" | 980 m || 
|-id=309 bgcolor=#d6d6d6
| 614309 ||  || — || December 20, 2008 || Mount Lemmon || Mount Lemmon Survey ||  || align=right | 2.5 km || 
|-id=310 bgcolor=#d6d6d6
| 614310 ||  || — || December 21, 2008 || Mount Lemmon || Mount Lemmon Survey ||  || align=right | 2.1 km || 
|-id=311 bgcolor=#E9E9E9
| 614311 ||  || — || December 21, 2008 || Kitt Peak || Spacewatch ||  || align=right data-sort-value="0.96" | 960 m || 
|-id=312 bgcolor=#E9E9E9
| 614312 ||  || — || December 21, 2008 || Kitt Peak || Spacewatch ||  || align=right data-sort-value="0.61" | 610 m || 
|-id=313 bgcolor=#FFC2E0
| 614313 ||  || — || December 29, 2008 || Mount Lemmon || Mount Lemmon Survey || APO +1km || align=right data-sort-value="0.78" | 780 m || 
|-id=314 bgcolor=#FA8072
| 614314 ||  || — || December 30, 2008 || Catalina || CSS || Tj (2.88) || align=right | 3.1 km || 
|-id=315 bgcolor=#fefefe
| 614315 ||  || — || December 30, 2008 || Magdalena Ridge || W. H. Ryan ||  || align=right data-sort-value="0.61" | 610 m || 
|-id=316 bgcolor=#FFC2E0
| 614316 ||  || — || December 31, 2008 || Catalina || CSS || APO || align=right data-sort-value="0.38" | 380 m || 
|-id=317 bgcolor=#d6d6d6
| 614317 ||  || — || December 22, 2008 || Kitt Peak || Spacewatch || THM || align=right | 1.6 km || 
|-id=318 bgcolor=#E9E9E9
| 614318 ||  || — || December 31, 2008 || Kitt Peak || Spacewatch ||  || align=right data-sort-value="0.77" | 770 m || 
|-id=319 bgcolor=#fefefe
| 614319 ||  || — || December 29, 2008 || Kitt Peak || Spacewatch ||  || align=right data-sort-value="0.54" | 540 m || 
|-id=320 bgcolor=#E9E9E9
| 614320 ||  || — || December 29, 2008 || Kitt Peak || Spacewatch ||  || align=right data-sort-value="0.83" | 830 m || 
|-id=321 bgcolor=#E9E9E9
| 614321 ||  || — || December 29, 2008 || Kitt Peak || Spacewatch ||  || align=right | 2.1 km || 
|-id=322 bgcolor=#d6d6d6
| 614322 ||  || — || December 29, 2008 || Mount Lemmon || Mount Lemmon Survey ||  || align=right | 2.8 km || 
|-id=323 bgcolor=#E9E9E9
| 614323 ||  || — || December 29, 2008 || Kitt Peak || Spacewatch ||  || align=right | 1.5 km || 
|-id=324 bgcolor=#d6d6d6
| 614324 ||  || — || December 29, 2008 || Kitt Peak || Spacewatch ||  || align=right | 1.6 km || 
|-id=325 bgcolor=#E9E9E9
| 614325 ||  || — || December 29, 2008 || Kitt Peak || Spacewatch || EUN || align=right | 1.1 km || 
|-id=326 bgcolor=#fefefe
| 614326 ||  || — || December 29, 2008 || Kitt Peak || Spacewatch || MAS || align=right data-sort-value="0.54" | 540 m || 
|-id=327 bgcolor=#d6d6d6
| 614327 ||  || — || December 29, 2008 || Kitt Peak || Spacewatch ||  || align=right | 4.1 km || 
|-id=328 bgcolor=#d6d6d6
| 614328 ||  || — || December 30, 2008 || Kitt Peak || Spacewatch ||  || align=right | 2.5 km || 
|-id=329 bgcolor=#E9E9E9
| 614329 ||  || — || December 21, 2008 || Kitt Peak || Spacewatch ||  || align=right data-sort-value="0.58" | 580 m || 
|-id=330 bgcolor=#E9E9E9
| 614330 ||  || — || December 21, 2008 || Mount Lemmon || Mount Lemmon Survey ||  || align=right | 1.1 km || 
|-id=331 bgcolor=#d6d6d6
| 614331 ||  || — || December 21, 2008 || Kitt Peak || Spacewatch ||  || align=right | 1.7 km || 
|-id=332 bgcolor=#E9E9E9
| 614332 ||  || — || December 30, 2008 || Mount Lemmon || Mount Lemmon Survey ||  || align=right data-sort-value="0.93" | 930 m || 
|-id=333 bgcolor=#d6d6d6
| 614333 ||  || — || December 22, 2008 || Kitt Peak || Spacewatch ||  || align=right | 2.1 km || 
|-id=334 bgcolor=#d6d6d6
| 614334 ||  || — || December 29, 2008 || Kitt Peak || Spacewatch ||  || align=right | 1.6 km || 
|-id=335 bgcolor=#fefefe
| 614335 ||  || — || December 29, 2008 || Kitt Peak || Spacewatch || MAS || align=right data-sort-value="0.43" | 430 m || 
|-id=336 bgcolor=#d6d6d6
| 614336 ||  || — || December 31, 2008 || Socorro || LINEAR ||  || align=right | 3.1 km || 
|-id=337 bgcolor=#d6d6d6
| 614337 ||  || — || December 29, 2008 || Mount Lemmon || Mount Lemmon Survey ||  || align=right | 1.8 km || 
|-id=338 bgcolor=#E9E9E9
| 614338 ||  || — || January 1, 2009 || Kitt Peak || Spacewatch || DOR || align=right | 1.9 km || 
|-id=339 bgcolor=#d6d6d6
| 614339 ||  || — || January 1, 2009 || Kitt Peak || Spacewatch || THM || align=right | 1.9 km || 
|-id=340 bgcolor=#fefefe
| 614340 ||  || — || January 1, 2009 || Kitt Peak || Spacewatch || MAS || align=right data-sort-value="0.44" | 440 m || 
|-id=341 bgcolor=#d6d6d6
| 614341 ||  || — || January 2, 2009 || Mount Lemmon || Mount Lemmon Survey ||  || align=right | 2.4 km || 
|-id=342 bgcolor=#d6d6d6
| 614342 ||  || — || January 2, 2009 || Mount Lemmon || Mount Lemmon Survey ||  || align=right | 3.0 km || 
|-id=343 bgcolor=#fefefe
| 614343 ||  || — || January 3, 2009 || Kitt Peak || Spacewatch ||  || align=right data-sort-value="0.67" | 670 m || 
|-id=344 bgcolor=#E9E9E9
| 614344 ||  || — || January 15, 2009 || Kitt Peak || Spacewatch ||  || align=right | 1.0 km || 
|-id=345 bgcolor=#d6d6d6
| 614345 ||  || — || January 2, 2009 || Mount Lemmon || Mount Lemmon Survey ||  || align=right | 2.6 km || 
|-id=346 bgcolor=#d6d6d6
| 614346 ||  || — || January 16, 2009 || Mount Lemmon || Mount Lemmon Survey ||  || align=right | 1.5 km || 
|-id=347 bgcolor=#d6d6d6
| 614347 ||  || — || January 17, 2009 || Kitt Peak || Spacewatch ||  || align=right | 2.8 km || 
|-id=348 bgcolor=#fefefe
| 614348 ||  || — || January 16, 2009 || Kitt Peak || Spacewatch ||  || align=right data-sort-value="0.64" | 640 m || 
|-id=349 bgcolor=#E9E9E9
| 614349 ||  || — || January 16, 2009 || Kitt Peak || Spacewatch ||  || align=right data-sort-value="0.74" | 740 m || 
|-id=350 bgcolor=#d6d6d6
| 614350 ||  || — || January 16, 2009 || Kitt Peak || Spacewatch || THM || align=right | 2.1 km || 
|-id=351 bgcolor=#E9E9E9
| 614351 ||  || — || January 16, 2009 || Kitt Peak || Spacewatch ||  || align=right data-sort-value="0.63" | 630 m || 
|-id=352 bgcolor=#E9E9E9
| 614352 ||  || — || January 16, 2009 || Kitt Peak || Spacewatch || EUN || align=right data-sort-value="0.71" | 710 m || 
|-id=353 bgcolor=#E9E9E9
| 614353 ||  || — || January 16, 2009 || Kitt Peak || Spacewatch ||  || align=right | 2.9 km || 
|-id=354 bgcolor=#fefefe
| 614354 ||  || — || January 16, 2009 || Mount Lemmon || Mount Lemmon Survey ||  || align=right data-sort-value="0.65" | 650 m || 
|-id=355 bgcolor=#E9E9E9
| 614355 ||  || — || January 16, 2009 || Mount Lemmon || Mount Lemmon Survey ||  || align=right | 1.1 km || 
|-id=356 bgcolor=#E9E9E9
| 614356 ||  || — || January 18, 2009 || Catalina || CSS ||  || align=right data-sort-value="0.86" | 860 m || 
|-id=357 bgcolor=#d6d6d6
| 614357 ||  || — || January 20, 2009 || Kitt Peak || Spacewatch ||  || align=right | 2.8 km || 
|-id=358 bgcolor=#fefefe
| 614358 ||  || — || January 25, 2009 || Socorro || LINEAR ||  || align=right data-sort-value="0.75" | 750 m || 
|-id=359 bgcolor=#E9E9E9
| 614359 ||  || — || January 25, 2009 || Kitt Peak || Spacewatch ||  || align=right data-sort-value="0.75" | 750 m || 
|-id=360 bgcolor=#d6d6d6
| 614360 ||  || — || January 25, 2009 || Kitt Peak || Spacewatch ||  || align=right | 2.2 km || 
|-id=361 bgcolor=#d6d6d6
| 614361 ||  || — || January 25, 2009 || Kitt Peak || Spacewatch ||  || align=right | 2.0 km || 
|-id=362 bgcolor=#d6d6d6
| 614362 ||  || — || January 26, 2009 || Mount Lemmon || Mount Lemmon Survey ||  || align=right | 2.4 km || 
|-id=363 bgcolor=#d6d6d6
| 614363 ||  || — || January 29, 2009 || Mount Lemmon || Mount Lemmon Survey ||  || align=right | 2.3 km || 
|-id=364 bgcolor=#d6d6d6
| 614364 ||  || — || January 25, 2009 || Kitt Peak || Spacewatch || 7:4 || align=right | 2.5 km || 
|-id=365 bgcolor=#E9E9E9
| 614365 ||  || — || January 29, 2009 || Kitt Peak || Spacewatch ||  || align=right data-sort-value="0.81" | 810 m || 
|-id=366 bgcolor=#fefefe
| 614366 ||  || — || January 29, 2009 || Kitt Peak || Spacewatch || critical || align=right data-sort-value="0.54" | 540 m || 
|-id=367 bgcolor=#d6d6d6
| 614367 ||  || — || January 30, 2009 || Kitt Peak || Spacewatch ||  || align=right | 3.0 km || 
|-id=368 bgcolor=#E9E9E9
| 614368 ||  || — || January 29, 2009 || Kitt Peak || Spacewatch ||  || align=right data-sort-value="0.72" | 720 m || 
|-id=369 bgcolor=#fefefe
| 614369 ||  || — || January 31, 2009 || Mount Lemmon || Mount Lemmon Survey ||  || align=right data-sort-value="0.58" | 580 m || 
|-id=370 bgcolor=#d6d6d6
| 614370 ||  || — || January 31, 2009 || Kitt Peak || Spacewatch || THM || align=right | 2.0 km || 
|-id=371 bgcolor=#d6d6d6
| 614371 ||  || — || January 31, 2009 || Kitt Peak || Spacewatch ||  || align=right | 1.8 km || 
|-id=372 bgcolor=#E9E9E9
| 614372 ||  || — || January 25, 2009 || Kitt Peak || Spacewatch ||  || align=right | 1.4 km || 
|-id=373 bgcolor=#E9E9E9
| 614373 ||  || — || January 26, 2009 || Socorro || LINEAR || EUN || align=right | 1.1 km || 
|-id=374 bgcolor=#FFC2E0
| 614374 ||  || — || February 3, 2009 || Catalina || CSS || APO +1km || align=right | 1.6 km || 
|-id=375 bgcolor=#d6d6d6
| 614375 ||  || — || February 1, 2009 || Kitt Peak || Spacewatch ||  || align=right | 3.0 km || 
|-id=376 bgcolor=#fefefe
| 614376 ||  || — || February 1, 2009 || Kitt Peak || Spacewatch ||  || align=right data-sort-value="0.78" | 780 m || 
|-id=377 bgcolor=#d6d6d6
| 614377 ||  || — || February 1, 2009 || Kitt Peak || Spacewatch ||  || align=right | 2.6 km || 
|-id=378 bgcolor=#E9E9E9
| 614378 ||  || — || February 2, 2009 || Kitt Peak || Spacewatch ||  || align=right data-sort-value="0.74" | 740 m || 
|-id=379 bgcolor=#E9E9E9
| 614379 ||  || — || February 2, 2009 || Mount Lemmon || Mount Lemmon Survey ||  || align=right data-sort-value="0.60" | 600 m || 
|-id=380 bgcolor=#d6d6d6
| 614380 ||  || — || February 2, 2009 || Mount Lemmon || Mount Lemmon Survey || LIX || align=right | 2.8 km || 
|-id=381 bgcolor=#fefefe
| 614381 ||  || — || February 13, 2009 || Kitt Peak || Spacewatch || MAS || align=right data-sort-value="0.54" | 540 m || 
|-id=382 bgcolor=#d6d6d6
| 614382 ||  || — || February 13, 2009 || Kitt Peak || Spacewatch ||  || align=right | 1.9 km || 
|-id=383 bgcolor=#d6d6d6
| 614383 ||  || — || February 14, 2009 || Kitt Peak || Spacewatch ||  || align=right | 2.0 km || 
|-id=384 bgcolor=#d6d6d6
| 614384 ||  || — || February 14, 2009 || Mount Lemmon || Mount Lemmon Survey ||  || align=right | 1.9 km || 
|-id=385 bgcolor=#d6d6d6
| 614385 ||  || — || February 1, 2009 || Kitt Peak || Spacewatch ||  || align=right | 2.4 km || 
|-id=386 bgcolor=#d6d6d6
| 614386 ||  || — || February 5, 2009 || Kitt Peak || Spacewatch ||  || align=right | 2.3 km || 
|-id=387 bgcolor=#E9E9E9
| 614387 ||  || — || February 21, 2009 || Catalina || CSS ||  || align=right | 1.9 km || 
|-id=388 bgcolor=#d6d6d6
| 614388 ||  || — || February 21, 2009 || Mount Lemmon || Mount Lemmon Survey || THM || align=right | 1.8 km || 
|-id=389 bgcolor=#fefefe
| 614389 ||  || — || February 22, 2009 || Calar Alto || F. Hormuth ||  || align=right data-sort-value="0.55" | 550 m || 
|-id=390 bgcolor=#d6d6d6
| 614390 ||  || — || February 23, 2009 || Calar Alto || F. Hormuth || THM || align=right | 1.8 km || 
|-id=391 bgcolor=#d6d6d6
| 614391 ||  || — || February 20, 2009 || Kitt Peak || Spacewatch ||  || align=right | 2.8 km || 
|-id=392 bgcolor=#d6d6d6
| 614392 ||  || — || February 19, 2009 || Kitt Peak || Spacewatch ||  || align=right | 2.5 km || 
|-id=393 bgcolor=#E9E9E9
| 614393 ||  || — || February 22, 2009 || Kitt Peak || Spacewatch ||  || align=right data-sort-value="0.61" | 610 m || 
|-id=394 bgcolor=#E9E9E9
| 614394 ||  || — || February 22, 2009 || Kitt Peak || Spacewatch ||  || align=right data-sort-value="0.79" | 790 m || 
|-id=395 bgcolor=#d6d6d6
| 614395 ||  || — || February 24, 2009 || Mount Lemmon || Mount Lemmon Survey ||  || align=right | 1.7 km || 
|-id=396 bgcolor=#E9E9E9
| 614396 ||  || — || February 21, 2009 || Mount Lemmon || Mount Lemmon Survey ||  || align=right data-sort-value="0.75" | 750 m || 
|-id=397 bgcolor=#d6d6d6
| 614397 ||  || — || February 26, 2009 || Mount Lemmon || Mount Lemmon Survey ||  || align=right | 2.4 km || 
|-id=398 bgcolor=#E9E9E9
| 614398 ||  || — || February 27, 2009 || Kitt Peak || Spacewatch ||  || align=right data-sort-value="0.58" | 580 m || 
|-id=399 bgcolor=#d6d6d6
| 614399 ||  || — || February 26, 2009 || Kitt Peak || Spacewatch ||  || align=right | 2.3 km || 
|-id=400 bgcolor=#fefefe
| 614400 ||  || — || February 26, 2009 || Kitt Peak || Spacewatch ||  || align=right data-sort-value="0.62" | 620 m || 
|}

614401–614500 

|-bgcolor=#d6d6d6
| 614401 ||  || — || February 19, 2009 || Catalina || CSS ||  || align=right | 4.7 km || 
|-id=402 bgcolor=#fefefe
| 614402 ||  || — || February 25, 2009 || Calar Alto || F. Hormuth ||  || align=right data-sort-value="0.57" | 570 m || 
|-id=403 bgcolor=#fefefe
| 614403 ||  || — || February 26, 2009 || Catalina || CSS || MAS || align=right data-sort-value="0.59" | 590 m || 
|-id=404 bgcolor=#d6d6d6
| 614404 ||  || — || February 19, 2009 || Kitt Peak || Spacewatch || LIX || align=right | 3.1 km || 
|-id=405 bgcolor=#fefefe
| 614405 ||  || — || March 1, 2009 || Kitt Peak || Spacewatch ||  || align=right data-sort-value="0.68" | 680 m || 
|-id=406 bgcolor=#FFC2E0
| 614406 ||  || — || March 19, 2009 || Mount Lemmon || Mount Lemmon Survey || APO || align=right data-sort-value="0.66" | 660 m || 
|-id=407 bgcolor=#fefefe
| 614407 ||  || — || March 18, 2009 || Mount Lemmon || Mount Lemmon Survey ||  || align=right data-sort-value="0.48" | 480 m || 
|-id=408 bgcolor=#fefefe
| 614408 ||  || — || March 18, 2009 || Mount Lemmon || Mount Lemmon Survey ||  || align=right data-sort-value="0.73" | 730 m || 
|-id=409 bgcolor=#fefefe
| 614409 ||  || — || March 19, 2009 || Mount Lemmon || Mount Lemmon Survey ||  || align=right | 1.7 km || 
|-id=410 bgcolor=#fefefe
| 614410 ||  || — || March 29, 2009 || Kitt Peak || Spacewatch ||  || align=right data-sort-value="0.63" | 630 m || 
|-id=411 bgcolor=#E9E9E9
| 614411 ||  || — || March 28, 2009 || Kitt Peak || Spacewatch ||  || align=right | 1.4 km || 
|-id=412 bgcolor=#fefefe
| 614412 ||  || — || March 19, 2009 || Catalina || CSS ||  || align=right | 1.2 km || 
|-id=413 bgcolor=#d6d6d6
| 614413 ||  || — || March 23, 2009 || Mount Lemmon || Mount Lemmon Survey || Tj (2.83) || align=right | 2.5 km || 
|-id=414 bgcolor=#fefefe
| 614414 ||  || — || March 17, 2009 || Kitt Peak || Spacewatch ||  || align=right data-sort-value="0.65" | 650 m || 
|-id=415 bgcolor=#E9E9E9
| 614415 ||  || — || March 29, 2009 || Kitt Peak || Spacewatch || EUN || align=right | 1.1 km || 
|-id=416 bgcolor=#E9E9E9
| 614416 ||  || — || March 22, 2009 || Catalina || CSS ||  || align=right | 2.9 km || 
|-id=417 bgcolor=#FFC2E0
| 614417 ||  || — || April 16, 2009 || Catalina || CSS || APO +1kmcritical || align=right data-sort-value="0.90" | 900 m || 
|-id=418 bgcolor=#fefefe
| 614418 ||  || — || April 17, 2009 || Catalina || CSS ||  || align=right data-sort-value="0.71" | 710 m || 
|-id=419 bgcolor=#E9E9E9
| 614419 ||  || — || April 17, 2009 || Kitt Peak || Spacewatch ||  || align=right | 1.2 km || 
|-id=420 bgcolor=#E9E9E9
| 614420 ||  || — || April 17, 2009 || Kitt Peak || Spacewatch ||  || align=right | 2.6 km || 
|-id=421 bgcolor=#fefefe
| 614421 ||  || — || April 20, 2009 || Mount Lemmon || Mount Lemmon Survey || H || align=right data-sort-value="0.66" | 660 m || 
|-id=422 bgcolor=#E9E9E9
| 614422 ||  || — || April 18, 2009 || Kitt Peak || Spacewatch ||  || align=right | 1.5 km || 
|-id=423 bgcolor=#d6d6d6
| 614423 ||  || — || April 28, 2009 || Mount Lemmon || Mount Lemmon Survey ||  || align=right | 2.4 km || 
|-id=424 bgcolor=#d6d6d6
| 614424 ||  || — || April 17, 2009 || Mount Lemmon || Mount Lemmon Survey ||  || align=right | 2.0 km || 
|-id=425 bgcolor=#d6d6d6
| 614425 ||  || — || April 18, 2009 || Kitt Peak || Spacewatch || LIX || align=right | 3.3 km || 
|-id=426 bgcolor=#E9E9E9
| 614426 ||  || — || April 20, 2009 || Kitt Peak || Spacewatch ||  || align=right | 1.6 km || 
|-id=427 bgcolor=#FFC2E0
| 614427 ||  || — || May 5, 2009 || Kitt Peak || Spacewatch || AMO || align=right data-sort-value="0.39" | 390 m || 
|-id=428 bgcolor=#d6d6d6
| 614428 ||  || — || May 2, 2009 || XuYi || PMO NEO || Tj (2.92) || align=right | 2.8 km || 
|-id=429 bgcolor=#d6d6d6
| 614429 ||  || — || May 13, 2009 || Kitt Peak || Spacewatch || LIX || align=right | 2.6 km || 
|-id=430 bgcolor=#d6d6d6
| 614430 ||  || — || May 13, 2009 || Mount Lemmon || Mount Lemmon Survey ||  || align=right | 2.2 km || 
|-id=431 bgcolor=#d6d6d6
| 614431 ||  || — || May 14, 2009 || Kitt Peak || Spacewatch ||  || align=right | 2.7 km || 
|-id=432 bgcolor=#fefefe
| 614432 ||  || — || May 17, 2009 || Calvin-Rehoboth || L. A. Molnar ||  || align=right data-sort-value="0.56" | 560 m || 
|-id=433 bgcolor=#FFC2E0
| 614433 ||  || — || May 17, 2009 || Catalina || CSS || APOPHA || align=right data-sort-value="0.27" | 270 m || 
|-id=434 bgcolor=#d6d6d6
| 614434 ||  || — || May 25, 2009 || Mount Lemmon || Mount Lemmon Survey ||  || align=right | 2.6 km || 
|-id=435 bgcolor=#E9E9E9
| 614435 ||  || — || May 26, 2009 || Kitt Peak || Spacewatch ||  || align=right data-sort-value="0.90" | 900 m || 
|-id=436 bgcolor=#d6d6d6
| 614436 ||  || — || May 26, 2009 || Kitt Peak || Spacewatch ||  || align=right | 2.4 km || 
|-id=437 bgcolor=#fefefe
| 614437 ||  || — || July 27, 2009 || Calvin-Rehoboth || Calvin–Rehoboth Obs. ||  || align=right data-sort-value="0.58" | 580 m || 
|-id=438 bgcolor=#d6d6d6
| 614438 ||  || — || July 28, 2009 || La Sagra || OAM Obs. ||  || align=right | 3.1 km || 
|-id=439 bgcolor=#E9E9E9
| 614439 ||  || — || July 28, 2009 || Kitt Peak || Spacewatch || EUN || align=right data-sort-value="0.88" | 880 m || 
|-id=440 bgcolor=#E9E9E9
| 614440 ||  || — || August 15, 2009 || Calvin-Rehoboth || L. A. Molnar ||  || align=right data-sort-value="0.80" | 800 m || 
|-id=441 bgcolor=#fefefe
| 614441 ||  || — || August 12, 2009 || La Sagra || OAM Obs. ||  || align=right data-sort-value="0.79" | 790 m || 
|-id=442 bgcolor=#fefefe
| 614442 ||  || — || August 15, 2009 || La Sagra || OAM Obs. ||  || align=right data-sort-value="0.79" | 790 m || 
|-id=443 bgcolor=#fefefe
| 614443 ||  || — || August 10, 2009 || Kitt Peak || Spacewatch ||  || align=right data-sort-value="0.55" | 550 m || 
|-id=444 bgcolor=#FA8072
| 614444 ||  || — || August 15, 2009 || Kitt Peak || Spacewatch ||  || align=right data-sort-value="0.59" | 590 m || 
|-id=445 bgcolor=#E9E9E9
| 614445 ||  || — || August 15, 2009 || Socorro || LINEAR ||  || align=right data-sort-value="0.95" | 950 m || 
|-id=446 bgcolor=#d6d6d6
| 614446 ||  || — || August 15, 2009 || Catalina || CSS ||  || align=right | 2.3 km || 
|-id=447 bgcolor=#fefefe
| 614447 ||  || — || August 17, 2009 || La Sagra || OAM Obs. || NYS || align=right data-sort-value="0.50" | 500 m || 
|-id=448 bgcolor=#d6d6d6
| 614448 ||  || — || August 16, 2009 || Catalina || CSS ||  || align=right | 2.5 km || 
|-id=449 bgcolor=#FFC2E0
| 614449 ||  || — || August 29, 2009 || Socorro || LINEAR || APO +1km || align=right data-sort-value="0.96" | 960 m || 
|-id=450 bgcolor=#E9E9E9
| 614450 ||  || — || August 25, 2009 || Sandlot || G. Hug ||  || align=right | 1.3 km || 
|-id=451 bgcolor=#d6d6d6
| 614451 ||  || — || August 25, 2009 || La Sagra || OAM Obs. ||  || align=right | 2.3 km || 
|-id=452 bgcolor=#d6d6d6
| 614452 ||  || — || August 26, 2009 || La Sagra || OAM Obs. ||  || align=right | 2.4 km || 
|-id=453 bgcolor=#fefefe
| 614453 ||  || — || August 28, 2009 || Kitt Peak || Spacewatch ||  || align=right data-sort-value="0.52" | 520 m || 
|-id=454 bgcolor=#FA8072
| 614454 ||  || — || September 10, 2009 || La Sagra || OAM Obs. ||  || align=right data-sort-value="0.66" | 660 m || 
|-id=455 bgcolor=#E9E9E9
| 614455 ||  || — || September 15, 2009 || Bisei SG Center || BATTeRS ||  || align=right | 1.5 km || 
|-id=456 bgcolor=#fefefe
| 614456 ||  || — || September 12, 2009 || Kitt Peak || Spacewatch || MAS || align=right data-sort-value="0.50" | 500 m || 
|-id=457 bgcolor=#fefefe
| 614457 ||  || — || September 12, 2009 || Kitt Peak || Spacewatch ||  || align=right data-sort-value="0.60" | 600 m || 
|-id=458 bgcolor=#fefefe
| 614458 ||  || — || September 12, 2009 || Kitt Peak || Spacewatch ||  || align=right data-sort-value="0.43" | 430 m || 
|-id=459 bgcolor=#d6d6d6
| 614459 ||  || — || September 12, 2009 || Kitt Peak || Spacewatch ||  || align=right | 1.7 km || 
|-id=460 bgcolor=#d6d6d6
| 614460 ||  || — || September 15, 2009 || Kitt Peak || Spacewatch ||  || align=right | 1.8 km || 
|-id=461 bgcolor=#E9E9E9
| 614461 ||  || — || September 15, 2009 || Kitt Peak || Spacewatch ||  || align=right data-sort-value="0.58" | 580 m || 
|-id=462 bgcolor=#FA8072
| 614462 ||  || — || September 15, 2009 || Kitt Peak || Spacewatch ||  || align=right data-sort-value="0.45" | 450 m || 
|-id=463 bgcolor=#d6d6d6
| 614463 ||  || — || September 15, 2009 || Kitt Peak || Spacewatch ||  || align=right | 1.3 km || 
|-id=464 bgcolor=#d6d6d6
| 614464 ||  || — || September 15, 2009 || Kitt Peak || Spacewatch ||  || align=right | 2.8 km || 
|-id=465 bgcolor=#fefefe
| 614465 ||  || — || September 15, 2009 || Kitt Peak || Spacewatch || NYS || align=right data-sort-value="0.49" | 490 m || 
|-id=466 bgcolor=#E9E9E9
| 614466 ||  || — || September 15, 2009 || Kitt Peak || Spacewatch ||  || align=right data-sort-value="0.94" | 940 m || 
|-id=467 bgcolor=#d6d6d6
| 614467 ||  || — || September 15, 2009 || Kitt Peak || Spacewatch ||  || align=right | 1.0 km || 
|-id=468 bgcolor=#C2FFFF
| 614468 ||  || — || September 15, 2009 || Kitt Peak || Spacewatch || L4 || align=right | 7.8 km || 
|-id=469 bgcolor=#d6d6d6
| 614469 ||  || — || September 14, 2009 || Kitt Peak || Spacewatch ||  || align=right | 1.7 km || 
|-id=470 bgcolor=#FFC2E0
| 614470 ||  || — || September 16, 2009 || SM Montmagastrell || J. M. Bosch || APOPHA || align=right data-sort-value="0.75" | 750 m || 
|-id=471 bgcolor=#E9E9E9
| 614471 ||  || — || September 16, 2009 || Kitt Peak || Spacewatch ||  || align=right data-sort-value="0.52" | 520 m || 
|-id=472 bgcolor=#d6d6d6
| 614472 ||  || — || September 16, 2009 || Kitt Peak || Spacewatch ||  || align=right | 3.1 km || 
|-id=473 bgcolor=#fefefe
| 614473 ||  || — || September 17, 2009 || Kitt Peak || Spacewatch ||  || align=right data-sort-value="0.54" | 540 m || 
|-id=474 bgcolor=#fefefe
| 614474 ||  || — || September 17, 2009 || Mount Lemmon || Mount Lemmon Survey ||  || align=right data-sort-value="0.41" | 410 m || 
|-id=475 bgcolor=#E9E9E9
| 614475 ||  || — || September 17, 2009 || Kitt Peak || Spacewatch ||  || align=right | 2.3 km || 
|-id=476 bgcolor=#E9E9E9
| 614476 ||  || — || September 17, 2009 || Kitt Peak || Spacewatch || DOR || align=right | 1.9 km || 
|-id=477 bgcolor=#fefefe
| 614477 ||  || — || September 18, 2009 || Kitt Peak || Spacewatch || V || align=right data-sort-value="0.40" | 400 m || 
|-id=478 bgcolor=#FFC2E0
| 614478 ||  || — || September 24, 2009 || Mount Lemmon || Mount Lemmon Survey || AMO || align=right data-sort-value="0.53" | 530 m || 
|-id=479 bgcolor=#E9E9E9
| 614479 ||  || — || September 16, 2009 || Mount Lemmon || Mount Lemmon Survey ||  || align=right | 2.2 km || 
|-id=480 bgcolor=#d6d6d6
| 614480 ||  || — || September 18, 2009 || Mount Lemmon || Mount Lemmon Survey ||  || align=right | 1.4 km || 
|-id=481 bgcolor=#d6d6d6
| 614481 ||  || — || September 18, 2009 || Kitt Peak || Spacewatch ||  || align=right | 1.7 km || 
|-id=482 bgcolor=#fefefe
| 614482 ||  || — || September 18, 2009 || Kitt Peak || Spacewatch ||  || align=right data-sort-value="0.51" | 510 m || 
|-id=483 bgcolor=#fefefe
| 614483 ||  || — || September 18, 2009 || Kitt Peak || Spacewatch ||  || align=right data-sort-value="0.63" | 630 m || 
|-id=484 bgcolor=#fefefe
| 614484 ||  || — || September 19, 2009 || Kitt Peak || Spacewatch ||  || align=right data-sort-value="0.44" | 440 m || 
|-id=485 bgcolor=#fefefe
| 614485 ||  || — || September 19, 2009 || Kitt Peak || Spacewatch || MAS || align=right data-sort-value="0.72" | 720 m || 
|-id=486 bgcolor=#fefefe
| 614486 ||  || — || September 20, 2009 || Kitt Peak || Spacewatch ||  || align=right data-sort-value="0.58" | 580 m || 
|-id=487 bgcolor=#E9E9E9
| 614487 ||  || — || September 21, 2009 || Mount Lemmon || Mount Lemmon Survey ||  || align=right | 1.9 km || 
|-id=488 bgcolor=#E9E9E9
| 614488 ||  || — || September 22, 2009 || Kitt Peak || Spacewatch ||  || align=right | 2.1 km || 
|-id=489 bgcolor=#fefefe
| 614489 ||  || — || September 21, 2009 || Kitt Peak || Spacewatch ||  || align=right data-sort-value="0.63" | 630 m || 
|-id=490 bgcolor=#fefefe
| 614490 ||  || — || September 22, 2009 || Mount Lemmon || Mount Lemmon Survey ||  || align=right data-sort-value="0.58" | 580 m || 
|-id=491 bgcolor=#E9E9E9
| 614491 ||  || — || September 22, 2009 || Kitt Peak || Spacewatch ||  || align=right | 1.3 km || 
|-id=492 bgcolor=#d6d6d6
| 614492 ||  || — || September 23, 2009 || Kitt Peak || Spacewatch ||  || align=right | 1.6 km || 
|-id=493 bgcolor=#E9E9E9
| 614493 ||  || — || September 23, 2009 || Kitt Peak || Spacewatch ||  || align=right | 1.2 km || 
|-id=494 bgcolor=#fefefe
| 614494 ||  || — || September 23, 2009 || Kitt Peak || Spacewatch ||  || align=right data-sort-value="0.62" | 620 m || 
|-id=495 bgcolor=#fefefe
| 614495 ||  || — || September 23, 2009 || Kitt Peak || Spacewatch ||  || align=right data-sort-value="0.55" | 550 m || 
|-id=496 bgcolor=#d6d6d6
| 614496 ||  || — || September 24, 2009 || Kitt Peak || Spacewatch || 7:4* || align=right | 2.2 km || 
|-id=497 bgcolor=#E9E9E9
| 614497 ||  || — || September 25, 2009 || Kitt Peak || Spacewatch || AGN || align=right | 1.00 km || 
|-id=498 bgcolor=#d6d6d6
| 614498 ||  || — || September 17, 2009 || La Sagra || OAM Obs. ||  || align=right | 3.3 km || 
|-id=499 bgcolor=#fefefe
| 614499 ||  || — || September 17, 2009 || Kitt Peak || Spacewatch ||  || align=right data-sort-value="0.60" | 600 m || 
|-id=500 bgcolor=#E9E9E9
| 614500 ||  || — || September 21, 2009 || Mount Lemmon || Mount Lemmon Survey || HOF || align=right | 1.9 km || 
|}

614501–614600 

|-bgcolor=#d6d6d6
| 614501 ||  || — || September 22, 2009 || Mount Lemmon || Mount Lemmon Survey ||  || align=right | 1.5 km || 
|-id=502 bgcolor=#E9E9E9
| 614502 ||  || — || September 23, 2009 || Kitt Peak || Spacewatch ||  || align=right | 2.0 km || 
|-id=503 bgcolor=#E9E9E9
| 614503 ||  || — || September 25, 2009 || Kitt Peak || Spacewatch ||  || align=right data-sort-value="0.64" | 640 m || 
|-id=504 bgcolor=#fefefe
| 614504 ||  || — || September 25, 2009 || Kitt Peak || Spacewatch || MAS || align=right data-sort-value="0.49" | 490 m || 
|-id=505 bgcolor=#E9E9E9
| 614505 ||  || — || September 28, 2009 || Mount Lemmon || Mount Lemmon Survey ||  || align=right | 2.2 km || 
|-id=506 bgcolor=#E9E9E9
| 614506 ||  || — || September 16, 2009 || Mount Lemmon || Mount Lemmon Survey ||  || align=right | 1.6 km || 
|-id=507 bgcolor=#C2FFFF
| 614507 ||  || — || September 18, 2009 || Kitt Peak || Spacewatch || L4 || align=right | 7.5 km || 
|-id=508 bgcolor=#d6d6d6
| 614508 ||  || — || September 20, 2009 || Kitt Peak || Spacewatch || Tj (2.97) || align=right | 1.2 km || 
|-id=509 bgcolor=#fefefe
| 614509 ||  || — || September 16, 2009 || Kitt Peak || Spacewatch || NYS || align=right data-sort-value="0.53" | 530 m || 
|-id=510 bgcolor=#E9E9E9
| 614510 ||  || — || September 16, 2009 || Kitt Peak || Spacewatch ||  || align=right data-sort-value="0.81" | 810 m || 
|-id=511 bgcolor=#d6d6d6
| 614511 ||  || — || September 17, 2009 || Kitt Peak || Spacewatch || THM || align=right | 1.6 km || 
|-id=512 bgcolor=#E9E9E9
| 614512 ||  || — || September 16, 2009 || Mount Lemmon || Mount Lemmon Survey || (1547) || align=right | 1.5 km || 
|-id=513 bgcolor=#d6d6d6
| 614513 ||  || — || September 21, 2009 || Mount Lemmon || Mount Lemmon Survey ||  || align=right | 2.2 km || 
|-id=514 bgcolor=#fefefe
| 614514 ||  || — || September 21, 2009 || Mount Lemmon || Mount Lemmon Survey || NYS || align=right data-sort-value="0.44" | 440 m || 
|-id=515 bgcolor=#E9E9E9
| 614515 ||  || — || September 22, 2009 || Kitt Peak || Spacewatch ||  || align=right | 1.8 km || 
|-id=516 bgcolor=#E9E9E9
| 614516 ||  || — || October 15, 2009 || Desert Moon || B. L. Stevens ||  || align=right | 2.1 km || 
|-id=517 bgcolor=#FA8072
| 614517 ||  || — || October 14, 2009 || Bisei SG Center || BATTeRS ||  || align=right data-sort-value="0.54" | 540 m || 
|-id=518 bgcolor=#E9E9E9
| 614518 ||  || — || October 14, 2009 || La Sagra || OAM Obs. || EUN || align=right | 1.1 km || 
|-id=519 bgcolor=#d6d6d6
| 614519 ||  || — || October 15, 2009 || La Sagra || OAM Obs. ||  || align=right | 3.6 km || 
|-id=520 bgcolor=#E9E9E9
| 614520 ||  || — || October 12, 2009 || Mount Lemmon || Mount Lemmon Survey ||  || align=right data-sort-value="0.78" | 780 m || 
|-id=521 bgcolor=#FFC2E0
| 614521 ||  || — || October 16, 2009 || Mount Lemmon || Mount Lemmon Survey || AMO || align=right data-sort-value="0.28" | 280 m || 
|-id=522 bgcolor=#d6d6d6
| 614522 ||  || — || October 17, 2009 || Mount Lemmon || Mount Lemmon Survey ||  || align=right | 1.5 km || 
|-id=523 bgcolor=#d6d6d6
| 614523 ||  || — || October 17, 2009 || Mount Lemmon || Mount Lemmon Survey ||  || align=right | 2.0 km || 
|-id=524 bgcolor=#C2FFFF
| 614524 ||  || — || October 22, 2009 || Mount Lemmon || Mount Lemmon Survey || L4 || align=right | 6.0 km || 
|-id=525 bgcolor=#fefefe
| 614525 ||  || — || October 18, 2009 || Mount Lemmon || Mount Lemmon Survey ||  || align=right data-sort-value="0.53" | 530 m || 
|-id=526 bgcolor=#E9E9E9
| 614526 ||  || — || October 18, 2009 || Mount Lemmon || Mount Lemmon Survey ||  || align=right | 1.5 km || 
|-id=527 bgcolor=#fefefe
| 614527 ||  || — || October 23, 2009 || Mount Lemmon || Mount Lemmon Survey ||  || align=right data-sort-value="0.59" | 590 m || 
|-id=528 bgcolor=#C2FFFF
| 614528 ||  || — || October 23, 2009 || Mount Lemmon || Mount Lemmon Survey || L4ERY || align=right | 6.8 km || 
|-id=529 bgcolor=#fefefe
| 614529 ||  || — || October 23, 2009 || Mount Lemmon || Mount Lemmon Survey ||  || align=right data-sort-value="0.55" | 550 m || 
|-id=530 bgcolor=#C2FFFF
| 614530 ||  || — || October 21, 2009 || Mount Lemmon || Mount Lemmon Survey || L4 || align=right | 6.9 km || 
|-id=531 bgcolor=#fefefe
| 614531 ||  || — || October 23, 2009 || Mount Lemmon || Mount Lemmon Survey ||  || align=right data-sort-value="0.55" | 550 m || 
|-id=532 bgcolor=#fefefe
| 614532 ||  || — || October 23, 2009 || Mount Lemmon || Mount Lemmon Survey || NYS || align=right data-sort-value="0.54" | 540 m || 
|-id=533 bgcolor=#FA8072
| 614533 ||  || — || October 18, 2009 || Catalina || CSS ||  || align=right | 1.1 km || 
|-id=534 bgcolor=#fefefe
| 614534 ||  || — || October 26, 2009 || Bisei SG Center || BATTeRS ||  || align=right data-sort-value="0.73" | 730 m || 
|-id=535 bgcolor=#fefefe
| 614535 ||  || — || October 23, 2009 || Mount Lemmon || Mount Lemmon Survey || NYS || align=right data-sort-value="0.65" | 650 m || 
|-id=536 bgcolor=#FA8072
| 614536 ||  || — || October 25, 2009 || Catalina || CSS ||  || align=right data-sort-value="0.67" | 670 m || 
|-id=537 bgcolor=#fefefe
| 614537 ||  || — || October 23, 2009 || Kitt Peak || Spacewatch || NYS || align=right data-sort-value="0.47" | 470 m || 
|-id=538 bgcolor=#E9E9E9
| 614538 ||  || — || October 21, 2009 || Mount Lemmon || Mount Lemmon Survey ||  || align=right data-sort-value="0.51" | 510 m || 
|-id=539 bgcolor=#E9E9E9
| 614539 ||  || — || October 22, 2009 || Mount Lemmon || Mount Lemmon Survey || HOF || align=right | 1.9 km || 
|-id=540 bgcolor=#d6d6d6
| 614540 ||  || — || October 23, 2009 || Mount Lemmon || Mount Lemmon Survey || THM || align=right | 1.5 km || 
|-id=541 bgcolor=#d6d6d6
| 614541 ||  || — || October 26, 2009 || Mount Lemmon || Mount Lemmon Survey ||  || align=right | 3.7 km || 
|-id=542 bgcolor=#E9E9E9
| 614542 ||  || — || October 17, 2009 || Mount Lemmon || Mount Lemmon Survey ||  || align=right data-sort-value="0.42" | 420 m || 
|-id=543 bgcolor=#fefefe
| 614543 ||  || — || November 8, 2009 || Kitt Peak || Spacewatch ||  || align=right data-sort-value="0.62" | 620 m || 
|-id=544 bgcolor=#d6d6d6
| 614544 ||  || — || November 9, 2009 || Mount Lemmon || Mount Lemmon Survey ||  || align=right | 3.1 km || 
|-id=545 bgcolor=#fefefe
| 614545 ||  || — || November 11, 2009 || Kitt Peak || Spacewatch ||  || align=right data-sort-value="0.59" | 590 m || 
|-id=546 bgcolor=#fefefe
| 614546 ||  || — || November 11, 2009 || Kitt Peak || Spacewatch ||  || align=right data-sort-value="0.57" | 570 m || 
|-id=547 bgcolor=#fefefe
| 614547 ||  || — || November 9, 2009 || Mount Lemmon || Mount Lemmon Survey ||  || align=right data-sort-value="0.57" | 570 m || 
|-id=548 bgcolor=#d6d6d6
| 614548 ||  || — || November 10, 2009 || Kitt Peak || Spacewatch || LIX || align=right | 3.4 km || 
|-id=549 bgcolor=#E9E9E9
| 614549 ||  || — || November 11, 2009 || Mount Lemmon || Mount Lemmon Survey ||  || align=right data-sort-value="0.63" | 630 m || 
|-id=550 bgcolor=#fefefe
| 614550 ||  || — || November 9, 2009 || Kitt Peak || Spacewatch ||  || align=right data-sort-value="0.58" | 580 m || 
|-id=551 bgcolor=#d6d6d6
| 614551 ||  || — || November 9, 2009 || Kitt Peak || Spacewatch ||  || align=right | 1.9 km || 
|-id=552 bgcolor=#fefefe
| 614552 ||  || — || November 9, 2009 || Kitt Peak || Spacewatch || NYS || align=right data-sort-value="0.40" | 400 m || 
|-id=553 bgcolor=#fefefe
| 614553 ||  || — || November 9, 2009 || Kitt Peak || Spacewatch ||  || align=right data-sort-value="0.69" | 690 m || 
|-id=554 bgcolor=#d6d6d6
| 614554 ||  || — || November 11, 2009 || Mount Lemmon || Mount Lemmon Survey ||  || align=right | 2.1 km || 
|-id=555 bgcolor=#fefefe
| 614555 ||  || — || November 8, 2009 || Kitt Peak || Spacewatch ||  || align=right data-sort-value="0.54" | 540 m || 
|-id=556 bgcolor=#d6d6d6
| 614556 ||  || — || November 8, 2009 || Catalina || CSS ||  || align=right | 2.3 km || 
|-id=557 bgcolor=#fefefe
| 614557 ||  || — || November 9, 2009 || Catalina || CSS || H || align=right data-sort-value="0.92" | 920 m || 
|-id=558 bgcolor=#d6d6d6
| 614558 ||  || — || November 10, 2009 || La Sagra || OAM Obs. ||  || align=right | 3.1 km || 
|-id=559 bgcolor=#E9E9E9
| 614559 ||  || — || November 16, 2009 || Mount Lemmon || Mount Lemmon Survey ||  || align=right | 1.8 km || 
|-id=560 bgcolor=#E9E9E9
| 614560 ||  || — || November 16, 2009 || Mount Lemmon || Mount Lemmon Survey ||  || align=right | 1.3 km || 
|-id=561 bgcolor=#FA8072
| 614561 ||  || — || November 19, 2009 || Mount Lemmon || Mount Lemmon Survey ||  || align=right data-sort-value="0.40" | 400 m || 
|-id=562 bgcolor=#fefefe
| 614562 ||  || — || November 16, 2009 || Mount Lemmon || Mount Lemmon Survey ||  || align=right data-sort-value="0.65" | 650 m || 
|-id=563 bgcolor=#E9E9E9
| 614563 ||  || — || November 16, 2009 || Mount Lemmon || Mount Lemmon Survey ||  || align=right data-sort-value="0.73" | 730 m || 
|-id=564 bgcolor=#fefefe
| 614564 ||  || — || November 17, 2009 || Kitt Peak || Spacewatch ||  || align=right data-sort-value="0.56" | 560 m || 
|-id=565 bgcolor=#fefefe
| 614565 ||  || — || November 19, 2009 || Kitt Peak || Spacewatch || NYS || align=right data-sort-value="0.51" | 510 m || 
|-id=566 bgcolor=#E9E9E9
| 614566 ||  || — || November 22, 2009 || Bisei SG Center || BATTeRS ||  || align=right | 1.9 km || 
|-id=567 bgcolor=#fefefe
| 614567 ||  || — || November 22, 2009 || Nazaret || G. Muler ||  || align=right data-sort-value="0.81" | 810 m || 
|-id=568 bgcolor=#fefefe
| 614568 ||  || — || November 16, 2009 || Mount Lemmon || Mount Lemmon Survey ||  || align=right data-sort-value="0.71" | 710 m || 
|-id=569 bgcolor=#C2FFFF
| 614569 ||  || — || November 16, 2009 || Mount Lemmon || Mount Lemmon Survey || L4 || align=right | 6.6 km || 
|-id=570 bgcolor=#E9E9E9
| 614570 ||  || — || November 18, 2009 || Kitt Peak || Spacewatch ||  || align=right data-sort-value="0.70" | 700 m || 
|-id=571 bgcolor=#E9E9E9
| 614571 ||  || — || November 18, 2009 || Kitt Peak || Spacewatch ||  || align=right | 1.6 km || 
|-id=572 bgcolor=#fefefe
| 614572 ||  || — || November 19, 2009 || La Sagra || OAM Obs. ||  || align=right data-sort-value="0.79" | 790 m || 
|-id=573 bgcolor=#C2FFFF
| 614573 ||  || — || November 20, 2009 || Kitt Peak || Spacewatch || L4 || align=right | 6.1 km || 
|-id=574 bgcolor=#d6d6d6
| 614574 ||  || — || November 21, 2009 || Kitt Peak || Spacewatch ||  || align=right | 2.7 km || 
|-id=575 bgcolor=#FA8072
| 614575 ||  || — || November 23, 2009 || La Sagra || OAM Obs. || H || align=right data-sort-value="0.57" | 570 m || 
|-id=576 bgcolor=#d6d6d6
| 614576 ||  || — || November 20, 2009 || Mount Lemmon || Mount Lemmon Survey ||  || align=right | 3.5 km || 
|-id=577 bgcolor=#E9E9E9
| 614577 ||  || — || November 23, 2009 || Mount Lemmon || Mount Lemmon Survey ||  || align=right data-sort-value="0.62" | 620 m || 
|-id=578 bgcolor=#d6d6d6
| 614578 ||  || — || November 21, 2009 || Kitt Peak || Spacewatch || LIX || align=right | 3.0 km || 
|-id=579 bgcolor=#fefefe
| 614579 ||  || — || November 22, 2009 || Kitt Peak || Spacewatch ||  || align=right data-sort-value="0.69" | 690 m || 
|-id=580 bgcolor=#fefefe
| 614580 ||  || — || November 23, 2009 || Kitt Peak || Spacewatch ||  || align=right data-sort-value="0.61" | 610 m || 
|-id=581 bgcolor=#fefefe
| 614581 ||  || — || November 26, 2009 || Kitt Peak || Spacewatch ||  || align=right data-sort-value="0.59" | 590 m || 
|-id=582 bgcolor=#d6d6d6
| 614582 ||  || — || November 16, 2009 || Kitt Peak || Spacewatch ||  || align=right | 2.6 km || 
|-id=583 bgcolor=#fefefe
| 614583 ||  || — || November 18, 2009 || Kitt Peak || Spacewatch ||  || align=right data-sort-value="0.64" | 640 m || 
|-id=584 bgcolor=#d6d6d6
| 614584 ||  || — || November 16, 2009 || Kitt Peak || Spacewatch ||  || align=right | 2.9 km || 
|-id=585 bgcolor=#fefefe
| 614585 ||  || — || November 17, 2009 || Kitt Peak || Spacewatch ||  || align=right data-sort-value="0.46" | 460 m || 
|-id=586 bgcolor=#E9E9E9
| 614586 ||  || — || November 21, 2009 || Kitt Peak || Spacewatch ||  || align=right data-sort-value="0.52" | 520 m || 
|-id=587 bgcolor=#fefefe
| 614587 ||  || — || November 20, 2009 || Kitt Peak || Spacewatch ||  || align=right data-sort-value="0.70" | 700 m || 
|-id=588 bgcolor=#d6d6d6
| 614588 ||  || — || November 21, 2009 || Kitt Peak || Spacewatch ||  || align=right | 2.0 km || 
|-id=589 bgcolor=#d6d6d6
| 614589 ||  || — || December 13, 2009 || Mount Lemmon || Mount Lemmon Survey ||  || align=right | 2.3 km || 
|-id=590 bgcolor=#B88A00
| 614590 ||  || — || December 15, 2009 || Mount Lemmon || Mount Lemmon Survey || Tj (2.82) || align=right | 3.9 km || 
|-id=591 bgcolor=#FA8072
| 614591 ||  || — || December 13, 2009 || Catalina || CSS ||  || align=right | 2.2 km || 
|-id=592 bgcolor=#C7FF8F
| 614592 ||  || — || December 17, 2009 || Mount Lemmon || Mount Lemmon Survey || damocloidcritical || align=right | 6.0 km || 
|-id=593 bgcolor=#E9E9E9
| 614593 ||  || — || December 16, 2009 || Kitt Peak || Spacewatch ||  || align=right data-sort-value="0.87" | 870 m || 
|-id=594 bgcolor=#fefefe
| 614594 ||  || — || December 25, 2009 || Kitt Peak || Spacewatch || MAS || align=right data-sort-value="0.54" | 540 m || 
|-id=595 bgcolor=#d6d6d6
| 614595 ||  || — || January 6, 2010 || Kitt Peak || Spacewatch || THM || align=right | 1.8 km || 
|-id=596 bgcolor=#E9E9E9
| 614596 ||  || — || January 6, 2010 || Kitt Peak || Spacewatch ||  || align=right | 2.0 km || 
|-id=597 bgcolor=#d6d6d6
| 614597 ||  || — || January 7, 2010 || Kitt Peak || Spacewatch ||  || align=right | 2.4 km || 
|-id=598 bgcolor=#E9E9E9
| 614598 ||  || — || January 11, 2010 || Kitt Peak || Spacewatch ||  || align=right | 2.5 km || 
|-id=599 bgcolor=#FFC2E0
| 614599 ||  || — || January 12, 2010 || WISE || WISE || AMO || align=right | 1.3 km || 
|-id=600 bgcolor=#d6d6d6
| 614600 ||  || — || January 16, 2010 || WISE || WISE ||  || align=right | 2.8 km || 
|}

614601–614700 

|-bgcolor=#d6d6d6
| 614601 ||  || — || January 20, 2010 || WISE || WISE || Tj (2.96) || align=right | 3.4 km || 
|-id=602 bgcolor=#d6d6d6
| 614602 ||  || — || January 25, 2010 || WISE || WISE || SHU3:2 || align=right | 4.4 km || 
|-id=603 bgcolor=#FFC2E0
| 614603 ||  || — || February 6, 2010 || Mount Lemmon || Mount Lemmon Survey || AMO || align=right | 1.2 km || 
|-id=604 bgcolor=#d6d6d6
| 614604 ||  || — || February 7, 2010 || WISE || WISE || Tj (2.97) || align=right | 3.1 km || 
|-id=605 bgcolor=#d6d6d6
| 614605 ||  || — || February 6, 2010 || Mount Lemmon || Mount Lemmon Survey ||  || align=right | 3.4 km || 
|-id=606 bgcolor=#fefefe
| 614606 ||  || — || February 13, 2010 || Socorro || LINEAR || PHO || align=right | 1.3 km || 
|-id=607 bgcolor=#d6d6d6
| 614607 ||  || — || February 11, 2010 || WISE || WISE ||  || align=right | 2.5 km || 
|-id=608 bgcolor=#E9E9E9
| 614608 ||  || — || February 14, 2010 || Socorro || LINEAR ||  || align=right | 1.2 km || 
|-id=609 bgcolor=#fefefe
| 614609 ||  || — || February 10, 2010 || Kitt Peak || Spacewatch ||  || align=right data-sort-value="0.55" | 550 m || 
|-id=610 bgcolor=#d6d6d6
| 614610 ||  || — || February 13, 2010 || Mount Lemmon || Mount Lemmon Survey ||  || align=right | 1.9 km || 
|-id=611 bgcolor=#fefefe
| 614611 ||  || — || February 13, 2010 || Mount Lemmon || Mount Lemmon Survey ||  || align=right data-sort-value="0.67" | 670 m || 
|-id=612 bgcolor=#d6d6d6
| 614612 ||  || — || February 13, 2010 || Mount Lemmon || Mount Lemmon Survey ||  || align=right | 2.1 km || 
|-id=613 bgcolor=#d6d6d6
| 614613 ||  || — || February 15, 2010 || Kitt Peak || Spacewatch ||  || align=right | 2.1 km || 
|-id=614 bgcolor=#d6d6d6
| 614614 ||  || — || February 10, 2010 || Kitt Peak || Spacewatch ||  || align=right | 2.1 km || 
|-id=615 bgcolor=#d6d6d6
| 614615 ||  || — || February 10, 2010 || Kitt Peak || Spacewatch || Tj (2.99) || align=right | 3.6 km || 
|-id=616 bgcolor=#fefefe
| 614616 ||  || — || February 13, 2010 || Haleakala || Pan-STARRS ||  || align=right data-sort-value="0.57" | 570 m || 
|-id=617 bgcolor=#E9E9E9
| 614617 ||  || — || February 14, 2010 || Haleakala || Pan-STARRS || MIS || align=right | 1.8 km || 
|-id=618 bgcolor=#fefefe
| 614618 ||  || — || February 15, 2010 || Haleakala || Pan-STARRS ||  || align=right data-sort-value="0.79" | 790 m || 
|-id=619 bgcolor=#fefefe
| 614619 ||  || — || February 15, 2010 || Haleakala || Pan-STARRS ||  || align=right data-sort-value="0.59" | 590 m || 
|-id=620 bgcolor=#FA8072
| 614620 ||  || — || February 8, 2010 || WISE || WISE || Tj (2.9) || align=right | 2.1 km || 
|-id=621 bgcolor=#fefefe
| 614621 ||  || — || February 17, 2010 || WISE || WISE ||  || align=right | 1.3 km || 
|-id=622 bgcolor=#E9E9E9
| 614622 ||  || — || February 24, 2010 || WISE || WISE ||  || align=right | 2.7 km || 
|-id=623 bgcolor=#d6d6d6
| 614623 ||  || — || February 28, 2010 || WISE || WISE || Tj (2.99) || align=right | 2.9 km || 
|-id=624 bgcolor=#d6d6d6
| 614624 ||  || — || February 17, 2010 || Kitt Peak || Spacewatch ||  || align=right | 2.0 km || 
|-id=625 bgcolor=#fefefe
| 614625 ||  || — || February 17, 2010 || Kitt Peak || Spacewatch ||  || align=right data-sort-value="0.64" | 640 m || 
|-id=626 bgcolor=#d6d6d6
| 614626 ||  || — || February 16, 2010 || Haleakala || Pan-STARRS ||  || align=right | 2.9 km || 
|-id=627 bgcolor=#fefefe
| 614627 ||  || — || March 9, 2010 || LightBuckets || S. Kürti || H || align=right data-sort-value="0.55" | 550 m || 
|-id=628 bgcolor=#d6d6d6
| 614628 ||  || — || March 5, 2010 || Catalina || CSS ||  || align=right | 2.0 km || 
|-id=629 bgcolor=#E9E9E9
| 614629 ||  || — || March 12, 2010 || Mount Lemmon || Mount Lemmon Survey ||  || align=right | 1.6 km || 
|-id=630 bgcolor=#d6d6d6
| 614630 ||  || — || March 12, 2010 || Kitt Peak || Spacewatch || Tj (2.97) || align=right | 1.8 km || 
|-id=631 bgcolor=#d6d6d6
| 614631 ||  || — || March 12, 2010 || Mount Lemmon || Mount Lemmon Survey ||  || align=right | 1.6 km || 
|-id=632 bgcolor=#d6d6d6
| 614632 ||  || — || March 15, 2010 || Mount Lemmon || Mount Lemmon Survey ||  || align=right | 1.6 km || 
|-id=633 bgcolor=#fefefe
| 614633 ||  || — || March 12, 2010 || Kitt Peak || Spacewatch ||  || align=right data-sort-value="0.64" | 640 m || 
|-id=634 bgcolor=#d6d6d6
| 614634 ||  || — || March 5, 2010 || Catalina || CSS || EUP || align=right | 4.1 km || 
|-id=635 bgcolor=#d6d6d6
| 614635 ||  || — || March 15, 2010 || Kitt Peak || Spacewatch ||  || align=right | 2.6 km || 
|-id=636 bgcolor=#d6d6d6
| 614636 ||  || — || March 13, 2010 || Kitt Peak || Spacewatch ||  || align=right | 2.8 km || 
|-id=637 bgcolor=#fefefe
| 614637 ||  || — || March 14, 2010 || Kitt Peak || Spacewatch || NYS || align=right data-sort-value="0.54" | 540 m || 
|-id=638 bgcolor=#fefefe
| 614638 ||  || — || March 13, 2010 || Kitt Peak || Spacewatch ||  || align=right data-sort-value="0.73" | 730 m || 
|-id=639 bgcolor=#d6d6d6
| 614639 ||  || — || March 18, 2010 || Mount Lemmon || Mount Lemmon Survey ||  || align=right | 2.0 km || 
|-id=640 bgcolor=#fefefe
| 614640 ||  || — || March 18, 2010 || Mount Lemmon || Mount Lemmon Survey ||  || align=right data-sort-value="0.61" | 610 m || 
|-id=641 bgcolor=#fefefe
| 614641 ||  || — || April 1, 2010 || WISE || WISE ||  || align=right | 1.9 km || 
|-id=642 bgcolor=#d6d6d6
| 614642 ||  || — || April 4, 2010 || Kitt Peak || Spacewatch || LIX || align=right | 3.6 km || 
|-id=643 bgcolor=#FFC2E0
| 614643 ||  || — || April 10, 2010 || WISE || WISE || AMO || align=right data-sort-value="0.49" | 490 m || 
|-id=644 bgcolor=#fefefe
| 614644 ||  || — || April 7, 2010 || Kitt Peak || Spacewatch || NYS || align=right data-sort-value="0.49" | 490 m || 
|-id=645 bgcolor=#E9E9E9
| 614645 ||  || — || April 14, 2010 || Kitt Peak || Spacewatch || EUN || align=right data-sort-value="0.90" | 900 m || 
|-id=646 bgcolor=#fefefe
| 614646 ||  || — || April 4, 2010 || Kitt Peak || Spacewatch ||  || align=right data-sort-value="0.72" | 720 m || 
|-id=647 bgcolor=#d6d6d6
| 614647 ||  || — || April 11, 2010 || Mount Lemmon || Mount Lemmon Survey ||  || align=right | 3.6 km || 
|-id=648 bgcolor=#E9E9E9
| 614648 ||  || — || April 29, 2010 || WISE || WISE ||  || align=right | 2.1 km || 
|-id=649 bgcolor=#E9E9E9
| 614649 ||  || — || May 1, 2010 || WISE || WISE ||  || align=right | 2.3 km || 
|-id=650 bgcolor=#fefefe
| 614650 ||  || — || May 3, 2010 || Kitt Peak || Spacewatch ||  || align=right data-sort-value="0.71" | 710 m || 
|-id=651 bgcolor=#d6d6d6
| 614651 ||  || — || May 7, 2010 || Kitt Peak || Spacewatch ||  || align=right | 2.4 km || 
|-id=652 bgcolor=#E9E9E9
| 614652 ||  || — || May 2, 2010 || Kitt Peak || Spacewatch || EUN || align=right | 1.0 km || 
|-id=653 bgcolor=#fefefe
| 614653 ||  || — || May 5, 2010 || Mount Lemmon || Mount Lemmon Survey ||  || align=right | 1.5 km || 
|-id=654 bgcolor=#FA8072
| 614654 ||  || — || May 13, 2010 || Nogales || Tenagra II Obs. ||  || align=right | 1.2 km || 
|-id=655 bgcolor=#fefefe
| 614655 ||  || — || May 10, 2010 || WISE || WISE || PHO || align=right | 1.8 km || 
|-id=656 bgcolor=#fefefe
| 614656 ||  || — || May 7, 2010 || Mount Lemmon || Mount Lemmon Survey ||  || align=right | 1.3 km || 
|-id=657 bgcolor=#E9E9E9
| 614657 ||  || — || May 13, 2010 || WISE || WISE ||  || align=right | 1.3 km || 
|-id=658 bgcolor=#fefefe
| 614658 ||  || — || May 14, 2010 || WISE || WISE ||  || align=right data-sort-value="0.95" | 950 m || 
|-id=659 bgcolor=#fefefe
| 614659 ||  || — || May 9, 2010 || Mount Lemmon || Mount Lemmon Survey ||  || align=right | 1.4 km || 
|-id=660 bgcolor=#fefefe
| 614660 ||  || — || May 9, 2010 || Mount Lemmon || Mount Lemmon Survey ||  || align=right | 1.1 km || 
|-id=661 bgcolor=#d6d6d6
| 614661 ||  || — || May 13, 2010 || Mount Lemmon || Mount Lemmon Survey || EMA || align=right | 3.2 km || 
|-id=662 bgcolor=#E9E9E9
| 614662 ||  || — || May 17, 2010 || Mount Lemmon || Mount Lemmon Survey ||  || align=right data-sort-value="0.91" | 910 m || 
|-id=663 bgcolor=#FA8072
| 614663 ||  || — || May 30, 2010 || WISE || WISE ||  || align=right | 1.8 km || 
|-id=664 bgcolor=#d6d6d6
| 614664 ||  || — || June 2, 2010 || WISE || WISE ||  || align=right | 2.4 km || 
|-id=665 bgcolor=#d6d6d6
| 614665 ||  || — || June 12, 2010 || WISE || WISE ||  || align=right | 3.6 km || 
|-id=666 bgcolor=#d6d6d6
| 614666 ||  || — || June 13, 2010 || WISE || WISE ||  || align=right | 2.5 km || 
|-id=667 bgcolor=#d6d6d6
| 614667 ||  || — || June 15, 2010 || WISE || WISE ||  || align=right | 1.8 km || 
|-id=668 bgcolor=#FA8072
| 614668 ||  || — || June 21, 2010 || WISE || WISE ||  || align=right data-sort-value="0.60" | 600 m || 
|-id=669 bgcolor=#E9E9E9
| 614669 ||  || — || June 18, 2010 || WISE || WISE ||  || align=right | 2.6 km || 
|-id=670 bgcolor=#d6d6d6
| 614670 ||  || — || June 30, 2010 || WISE || WISE || 3:2 || align=right | 4.6 km || 
|-id=671 bgcolor=#E9E9E9
| 614671 ||  || — || July 8, 2010 || WISE || WISE ||  || align=right | 1.6 km || 
|-id=672 bgcolor=#E9E9E9
| 614672 ||  || — || July 8, 2010 || WISE || WISE ||  || align=right | 1.6 km || 
|-id=673 bgcolor=#d6d6d6
| 614673 ||  || — || July 13, 2010 || La Sagra || OAM Obs. ||  || align=right | 2.5 km || 
|-id=674 bgcolor=#FA8072
| 614674 ||  || — || July 17, 2010 || WISE || WISE ||  || align=right | 2.2 km || 
|-id=675 bgcolor=#d6d6d6
| 614675 ||  || — || July 30, 2010 || WISE || WISE || Tj (2.99) || align=right | 3.2 km || 
|-id=676 bgcolor=#fefefe
| 614676 ||  || — || August 3, 2010 || Socorro || LINEAR ||  || align=right data-sort-value="0.67" | 670 m || 
|-id=677 bgcolor=#E9E9E9
| 614677 ||  || — || August 4, 2010 || Socorro || LINEAR ||  || align=right data-sort-value="0.98" | 980 m || 
|-id=678 bgcolor=#d6d6d6
| 614678 ||  || — || August 6, 2010 || Socorro || LINEAR ||  || align=right | 2.1 km || 
|-id=679 bgcolor=#fefefe
| 614679 ||  || — || August 7, 2010 || La Sagra || OAM Obs. || MAS || align=right data-sort-value="0.62" | 620 m || 
|-id=680 bgcolor=#d6d6d6
| 614680 ||  || — || August 11, 2010 || La Sagra || OAM Obs. ||  || align=right | 2.6 km || 
|-id=681 bgcolor=#E9E9E9
| 614681 ||  || — || September 2, 2010 || La Sagra || OAM Obs. ||  || align=right | 1.9 km || 
|-id=682 bgcolor=#E9E9E9
| 614682 ||  || — || September 10, 2010 || La Sagra || OAM Obs. ||  || align=right data-sort-value="0.96" | 960 m || 
|-id=683 bgcolor=#E9E9E9
| 614683 ||  || — || September 1, 2010 || Mount Lemmon || Mount Lemmon Survey ||  || align=right | 1.7 km || 
|-id=684 bgcolor=#fefefe
| 614684 ||  || — || September 10, 2010 || Kitt Peak || Spacewatch || MAS || align=right data-sort-value="0.47" | 470 m || 
|-id=685 bgcolor=#fefefe
| 614685 ||  || — || September 4, 2010 || La Sagra || OAM Obs. ||  || align=right data-sort-value="0.52" | 520 m || 
|-id=686 bgcolor=#E9E9E9
| 614686 ||  || — || September 2, 2010 || Mount Lemmon || Mount Lemmon Survey ||  || align=right | 1.2 km || 
|-id=687 bgcolor=#E9E9E9
| 614687 ||  || — || November 11, 2010 || Mount Lemmon || Mount Lemmon Survey ||  || align=right data-sort-value="0.99" | 990 m || 
|-id=688 bgcolor=#C2E0FF
| 614688 ||  || — || May 30, 2011 || Mauna Kea || M. Micheli, D. J. Tholen || cubewano (cold)critical || align=right | 184 km || 
|-id=689 bgcolor=#FFC2E0
| 614689 ||  || — || December 12, 2020 || Haleakala || Pan-STARRS || APO || align=right data-sort-value="0.31" | 310 m || 
|-id=690 bgcolor=#E9E9E9
| 614690 ||  || — || December 4, 2021 || Calar Alto-Schmidt || M. Micheli ||  || align=right data-sort-value="0.96" | 960 m || 
|-id=691 bgcolor=#d6d6d6
| 614691 ||  || — || January 8, 1994 || Kitt Peak || Spacewatch ||  || align=right | 3.4 km || 
|-id=692 bgcolor=#fefefe
| 614692 ||  || — || October 23, 2008 || Mount Lemmon || Mount Lemmon Survey ||  || align=right data-sort-value="0.83" | 830 m || 
|-id=693 bgcolor=#fefefe
| 614693 ||  || — || July 27, 1995 || Kitt Peak || Spacewatch ||  || align=right data-sort-value="0.49" | 490 m || 
|-id=694 bgcolor=#E9E9E9
| 614694 ||  || — || September 25, 1995 || Kitt Peak || Spacewatch ||  || align=right | 1.4 km || 
|-id=695 bgcolor=#d6d6d6
| 614695 ||  || — || September 30, 1995 || Kitt Peak || Spacewatch ||  || align=right | 2.5 km || 
|-id=696 bgcolor=#d6d6d6
| 614696 ||  || — || September 26, 1995 || Kitt Peak || Spacewatch ||  || align=right | 2.4 km || 
|-id=697 bgcolor=#fefefe
| 614697 ||  || — || September 29, 1995 || Kitt Peak || Spacewatch ||  || align=right data-sort-value="0.64" | 640 m || 
|-id=698 bgcolor=#d6d6d6
| 614698 ||  || — || September 14, 2006 || Kitt Peak || Spacewatch ||  || align=right | 2.6 km || 
|-id=699 bgcolor=#fefefe
| 614699 ||  || — || October 15, 1995 || Kitt Peak || Spacewatch ||  || align=right data-sort-value="0.61" | 610 m || 
|-id=700 bgcolor=#d6d6d6
| 614700 ||  || — || October 19, 1995 || Kitt Peak || Spacewatch ||  || align=right | 2.4 km || 
|}

614701–614800 

|-bgcolor=#fefefe
| 614701 ||  || — || October 19, 1995 || Kitt Peak || Spacewatch ||  || align=right data-sort-value="0.54" | 540 m || 
|-id=702 bgcolor=#d6d6d6
| 614702 ||  || — || October 19, 1995 || Kitt Peak || Spacewatch ||  || align=right | 2.1 km || 
|-id=703 bgcolor=#fefefe
| 614703 ||  || — || October 21, 1995 || Kitt Peak || Spacewatch ||  || align=right data-sort-value="0.72" | 720 m || 
|-id=704 bgcolor=#fefefe
| 614704 ||  || — || October 23, 1995 || Kitt Peak || Spacewatch ||  || align=right data-sort-value="0.60" | 600 m || 
|-id=705 bgcolor=#d6d6d6
| 614705 ||  || — || October 28, 1995 || Kitt Peak || Spacewatch ||  || align=right | 2.2 km || 
|-id=706 bgcolor=#d6d6d6
| 614706 ||  || — || October 17, 1995 || Kitt Peak || Spacewatch ||  || align=right | 1.9 km || 
|-id=707 bgcolor=#fefefe
| 614707 ||  || — || October 28, 1995 || Kitt Peak || Spacewatch ||  || align=right data-sort-value="0.55" | 550 m || 
|-id=708 bgcolor=#E9E9E9
| 614708 ||  || — || November 18, 1995 || Kitt Peak || Spacewatch ||  || align=right data-sort-value="0.76" | 760 m || 
|-id=709 bgcolor=#d6d6d6
| 614709 ||  || — || December 20, 1995 || Kitt Peak || Spacewatch ||  || align=right | 3.4 km || 
|-id=710 bgcolor=#fefefe
| 614710 ||  || — || January 18, 1996 || Kitt Peak || Spacewatch ||  || align=right data-sort-value="0.58" | 580 m || 
|-id=711 bgcolor=#d6d6d6
| 614711 ||  || — || February 10, 1996 || Kitt Peak || Spacewatch ||  || align=right | 1.6 km || 
|-id=712 bgcolor=#E9E9E9
| 614712 ||  || — || March 11, 1996 || Kitt Peak || Spacewatch ||  || align=right | 1.4 km || 
|-id=713 bgcolor=#E9E9E9
| 614713 ||  || — || September 7, 1996 || Kitt Peak || Spacewatch ||  || align=right data-sort-value="0.55" | 550 m || 
|-id=714 bgcolor=#fefefe
| 614714 ||  || — || September 19, 2003 || Kitt Peak || Spacewatch ||  || align=right data-sort-value="0.70" | 700 m || 
|-id=715 bgcolor=#d6d6d6
| 614715 ||  || — || October 5, 1996 || Kitt Peak || Spacewatch ||  || align=right | 2.6 km || 
|-id=716 bgcolor=#d6d6d6
| 614716 ||  || — || November 10, 1996 || Kitt Peak || Spacewatch ||  || align=right | 1.8 km || 
|-id=717 bgcolor=#fefefe
| 614717 ||  || — || November 13, 1996 || Kitt Peak || Spacewatch ||  || align=right data-sort-value="0.98" | 980 m || 
|-id=718 bgcolor=#fefefe
| 614718 ||  || — || November 29, 2003 || Kitt Peak || Spacewatch ||  || align=right data-sort-value="0.91" | 910 m || 
|-id=719 bgcolor=#E9E9E9
| 614719 ||  || — || November 18, 1996 || Kitt Peak || Spacewatch ||  || align=right | 2.1 km || 
|-id=720 bgcolor=#d6d6d6
| 614720 ||  || — || December 6, 1996 || Kitt Peak || Spacewatch ||  || align=right | 2.0 km || 
|-id=721 bgcolor=#E9E9E9
| 614721 ||  || — || July 2, 1997 || Kitt Peak || Spacewatch ||  || align=right data-sort-value="0.90" | 900 m || 
|-id=722 bgcolor=#d6d6d6
| 614722 ||  || — || July 6, 1997 || Kitt Peak || Spacewatch ||  || align=right | 2.2 km || 
|-id=723 bgcolor=#fefefe
| 614723 ||  || — || October 4, 1997 || Kitt Peak || Spacewatch ||  || align=right data-sort-value="0.60" | 600 m || 
|-id=724 bgcolor=#fefefe
| 614724 ||  || — || September 6, 2013 || Kitt Peak || Spacewatch ||  || align=right data-sort-value="0.54" | 540 m || 
|-id=725 bgcolor=#d6d6d6
| 614725 ||  || — || October 23, 1997 || Kitt Peak || Spacewatch ||  || align=right | 2.6 km || 
|-id=726 bgcolor=#fefefe
| 614726 ||  || — || December 29, 1997 || Kitt Peak || Spacewatch ||  || align=right data-sort-value="0.78" | 780 m || 
|-id=727 bgcolor=#fefefe
| 614727 ||  || — || January 31, 1998 || Kitt Peak || Spacewatch ||  || align=right data-sort-value="0.83" | 830 m || 
|-id=728 bgcolor=#fefefe
| 614728 ||  || — || February 24, 1998 || Kitt Peak || Spacewatch ||  || align=right data-sort-value="0.51" | 510 m || 
|-id=729 bgcolor=#E9E9E9
| 614729 ||  || — || November 9, 2009 || Mount Lemmon || Mount Lemmon Survey ||  || align=right | 1.5 km || 
|-id=730 bgcolor=#E9E9E9
| 614730 ||  || — || May 28, 1998 || Kitt Peak || Spacewatch ||  || align=right | 2.2 km || 
|-id=731 bgcolor=#fefefe
| 614731 ||  || — || August 30, 1998 || Kitt Peak || Spacewatch ||  || align=right data-sort-value="0.56" | 560 m || 
|-id=732 bgcolor=#d6d6d6
| 614732 ||  || — || July 26, 2008 || Siding Spring || SSS ||  || align=right | 1.8 km || 
|-id=733 bgcolor=#fefefe
| 614733 ||  || — || September 15, 1998 || Kitt Peak || Spacewatch ||  || align=right data-sort-value="0.68" | 680 m || 
|-id=734 bgcolor=#d6d6d6
| 614734 ||  || — || September 17, 1998 || Kitt Peak || Spacewatch ||  || align=right | 2.2 km || 
|-id=735 bgcolor=#d6d6d6
| 614735 ||  || — || September 17, 1998 || Kitt Peak || Spacewatch ||  || align=right | 2.7 km || 
|-id=736 bgcolor=#d6d6d6
| 614736 ||  || — || October 24, 1998 || Kitt Peak || Spacewatch ||  || align=right | 3.3 km || 
|-id=737 bgcolor=#d6d6d6
| 614737 ||  || — || September 19, 1998 || Apache Point || SDSS Collaboration ||  || align=right | 2.1 km || 
|-id=738 bgcolor=#fefefe
| 614738 ||  || — || September 28, 1998 || Kitt Peak || Spacewatch ||  || align=right data-sort-value="0.58" | 580 m || 
|-id=739 bgcolor=#E9E9E9
| 614739 ||  || — || September 19, 1998 || Apache Point || SDSS Collaboration ||  || align=right data-sort-value="0.71" | 710 m || 
|-id=740 bgcolor=#d6d6d6
| 614740 ||  || — || October 14, 1998 || Kitt Peak || Spacewatch ||  || align=right | 2.6 km || 
|-id=741 bgcolor=#d6d6d6
| 614741 ||  || — || October 16, 1998 || Kitt Peak || Spacewatch ||  || align=right | 2.5 km || 
|-id=742 bgcolor=#fefefe
| 614742 ||  || — || October 29, 1998 || Kitt Peak || Spacewatch ||  || align=right data-sort-value="0.55" | 550 m || 
|-id=743 bgcolor=#d6d6d6
| 614743 ||  || — || October 18, 2003 || Kitt Peak || Spacewatch ||  || align=right | 2.1 km || 
|-id=744 bgcolor=#fefefe
| 614744 ||  || — || November 14, 1998 || Kitt Peak || Spacewatch ||  || align=right | 1.0 km || 
|-id=745 bgcolor=#fefefe
| 614745 ||  || — || November 14, 1998 || Kitt Peak || Spacewatch ||  || align=right data-sort-value="0.56" | 560 m || 
|-id=746 bgcolor=#fefefe
| 614746 ||  || — || October 22, 2005 || Kitt Peak || Spacewatch ||  || align=right data-sort-value="0.70" | 700 m || 
|-id=747 bgcolor=#fefefe
| 614747 ||  || — || January 19, 1999 || Kitt Peak || Spacewatch ||  || align=right data-sort-value="0.62" | 620 m || 
|-id=748 bgcolor=#d6d6d6
| 614748 ||  || — || June 22, 2007 || Kitt Peak || Spacewatch ||  || align=right | 2.7 km || 
|-id=749 bgcolor=#d6d6d6
| 614749 ||  || — || August 14, 2012 || Les Engarouines || L. Bernasconi ||  || align=right | 3.3 km || 
|-id=750 bgcolor=#E9E9E9
| 614750 ||  || — || August 31, 2005 || Kitt Peak || Spacewatch ||  || align=right | 1.7 km || 
|-id=751 bgcolor=#fefefe
| 614751 ||  || — || November 30, 2000 || Kitt Peak || Spacewatch ||  || align=right data-sort-value="0.65" | 650 m || 
|-id=752 bgcolor=#d6d6d6
| 614752 ||  || — || October 3, 2013 || Mount Lemmon || Mount Lemmon Survey ||  || align=right | 2.4 km || 
|-id=753 bgcolor=#d6d6d6
| 614753 ||  || — || April 23, 2015 || Haleakala || Pan-STARRS ||  || align=right | 1.9 km || 
|-id=754 bgcolor=#fefefe
| 614754 ||  || — || May 18, 1999 || Socorro || LINEAR ||  || align=right | 1.2 km || 
|-id=755 bgcolor=#fefefe
| 614755 ||  || — || August 6, 1999 || Cerro Tololo ||  ||  || align=right data-sort-value="0.60" | 600 m || 
|-id=756 bgcolor=#fefefe
| 614756 ||  || — || September 16, 2003 || Kitt Peak || Spacewatch ||  || align=right data-sort-value="0.76" | 760 m || 
|-id=757 bgcolor=#E9E9E9
| 614757 ||  || — || September 8, 1999 || Socorro || LINEAR ||  || align=right data-sort-value="0.98" | 980 m || 
|-id=758 bgcolor=#FA8072
| 614758 ||  || — || August 22, 1999 || Catalina || CSS ||  || align=right data-sort-value="0.89" | 890 m || 
|-id=759 bgcolor=#fefefe
| 614759 ||  || — || September 4, 1999 || Kitt Peak || Spacewatch ||  || align=right data-sort-value="0.47" | 470 m || 
|-id=760 bgcolor=#d6d6d6
| 614760 ||  || — || March 16, 2007 || Mount Lemmon || Mount Lemmon Survey ||  || align=right | 2.6 km || 
|-id=761 bgcolor=#fefefe
| 614761 ||  || — || October 21, 2006 || Mount Lemmon || Mount Lemmon Survey ||  || align=right data-sort-value="0.53" | 530 m || 
|-id=762 bgcolor=#FA8072
| 614762 ||  || — || October 2, 1999 || Kitt Peak || Spacewatch ||  || align=right data-sort-value="0.47" | 470 m || 
|-id=763 bgcolor=#fefefe
| 614763 ||  || — || October 4, 1999 || Kitt Peak || Spacewatch ||  || align=right data-sort-value="0.70" | 700 m || 
|-id=764 bgcolor=#fefefe
| 614764 ||  || — || October 4, 1999 || Kitt Peak || Spacewatch ||  || align=right data-sort-value="0.51" | 510 m || 
|-id=765 bgcolor=#E9E9E9
| 614765 ||  || — || September 19, 2003 || Kitt Peak || Spacewatch ||  || align=right data-sort-value="0.96" | 960 m || 
|-id=766 bgcolor=#E9E9E9
| 614766 ||  || — || October 6, 1999 || Kitt Peak || Spacewatch ||  || align=right data-sort-value="0.99" | 990 m || 
|-id=767 bgcolor=#E9E9E9
| 614767 ||  || — || October 9, 1999 || Kitt Peak || Spacewatch ||  || align=right | 1.2 km || 
|-id=768 bgcolor=#E9E9E9
| 614768 ||  || — || October 9, 1999 || Kitt Peak || Spacewatch ||  || align=right data-sort-value="0.94" | 940 m || 
|-id=769 bgcolor=#d6d6d6
| 614769 ||  || — || October 13, 1999 || Kitt Peak || Spacewatch ||  || align=right | 2.0 km || 
|-id=770 bgcolor=#E9E9E9
| 614770 ||  || — || October 15, 1999 || Kitt Peak || Spacewatch ||  || align=right data-sort-value="0.83" | 830 m || 
|-id=771 bgcolor=#fefefe
| 614771 ||  || — || October 4, 1999 || Kitt Peak || Spacewatch ||  || align=right data-sort-value="0.48" | 480 m || 
|-id=772 bgcolor=#E9E9E9
| 614772 ||  || — || January 17, 2005 || Kitt Peak || Spacewatch ||  || align=right data-sort-value="0.93" | 930 m || 
|-id=773 bgcolor=#d6d6d6
| 614773 ||  || — || August 8, 2016 || Haleakala || Pan-STARRS ||  || align=right | 3.1 km || 
|-id=774 bgcolor=#E9E9E9
| 614774 ||  || — || October 16, 2003 || Kitt Peak || Spacewatch ||  || align=right data-sort-value="0.90" | 900 m || 
|-id=775 bgcolor=#fefefe
| 614775 ||  || — || March 16, 2004 || Kitt Peak || Spacewatch ||  || align=right data-sort-value="0.71" | 710 m || 
|-id=776 bgcolor=#fefefe
| 614776 ||  || — || October 19, 1999 || Kitt Peak || Spacewatch ||  || align=right data-sort-value="0.56" | 560 m || 
|-id=777 bgcolor=#E9E9E9
| 614777 ||  || — || October 14, 1999 || Kitt Peak || Spacewatch ||  || align=right | 1.1 km || 
|-id=778 bgcolor=#E9E9E9
| 614778 ||  || — || October 12, 1999 || Kitt Peak || Spacewatch ||  || align=right | 2.0 km || 
|-id=779 bgcolor=#fefefe
| 614779 ||  || — || November 17, 2006 || Kitt Peak || Spacewatch ||  || align=right data-sort-value="0.65" | 650 m || 
|-id=780 bgcolor=#fefefe
| 614780 ||  || — || October 2, 2006 || Mount Lemmon || Mount Lemmon Survey ||  || align=right data-sort-value="0.54" | 540 m || 
|-id=781 bgcolor=#fefefe
| 614781 ||  || — || November 2, 1999 || Kitt Peak || Spacewatch ||  || align=right data-sort-value="0.56" | 560 m || 
|-id=782 bgcolor=#E9E9E9
| 614782 ||  || — || November 4, 1999 || Kitt Peak || Spacewatch ||  || align=right | 1.7 km || 
|-id=783 bgcolor=#E9E9E9
| 614783 ||  || — || November 4, 1999 || Socorro || LINEAR ||  || align=right | 1.9 km || 
|-id=784 bgcolor=#fefefe
| 614784 ||  || — || November 9, 1999 || Socorro || LINEAR ||  || align=right data-sort-value="0.63" | 630 m || 
|-id=785 bgcolor=#E9E9E9
| 614785 ||  || — || November 10, 1999 || Kitt Peak || Spacewatch ||  || align=right data-sort-value="0.99" | 990 m || 
|-id=786 bgcolor=#E9E9E9
| 614786 ||  || — || November 11, 1999 || Kitt Peak || Spacewatch ||  || align=right data-sort-value="0.90" | 900 m || 
|-id=787 bgcolor=#fefefe
| 614787 ||  || — || November 1, 1999 || Kitt Peak || Spacewatch ||  || align=right data-sort-value="0.44" | 440 m || 
|-id=788 bgcolor=#E9E9E9
| 614788 ||  || — || November 1, 1999 || Kitt Peak || Spacewatch ||  || align=right | 1.3 km || 
|-id=789 bgcolor=#E9E9E9
| 614789 ||  || — || November 1, 1999 || Kitt Peak || Spacewatch ||  || align=right data-sort-value="0.70" | 700 m || 
|-id=790 bgcolor=#fefefe
| 614790 ||  || — || November 5, 1999 || Kitt Peak || Spacewatch ||  || align=right data-sort-value="0.62" | 620 m || 
|-id=791 bgcolor=#E9E9E9
| 614791 ||  || — || May 23, 2006 || Kitt Peak || Spacewatch ||  || align=right | 1.8 km || 
|-id=792 bgcolor=#FA8072
| 614792 ||  || — || April 27, 2012 || Haleakala || Pan-STARRS ||  || align=right data-sort-value="0.44" | 440 m || 
|-id=793 bgcolor=#E9E9E9
| 614793 ||  || — || December 14, 1999 || Kitt Peak || Spacewatch ||  || align=right | 1.1 km || 
|-id=794 bgcolor=#E9E9E9
| 614794 ||  || — || December 7, 1999 || Catalina || CSS ||  || align=right | 1.3 km || 
|-id=795 bgcolor=#E9E9E9
| 614795 ||  || — || December 12, 1999 || Kitt Peak || Spacewatch ||  || align=right | 1.3 km || 
|-id=796 bgcolor=#fefefe
| 614796 ||  || — || December 11, 2013 || Mount Lemmon || Mount Lemmon Survey ||  || align=right data-sort-value="0.69" | 690 m || 
|-id=797 bgcolor=#d6d6d6
| 614797 ||  || — || January 6, 2000 || Kitt Peak || Spacewatch ||  || align=right | 3.1 km || 
|-id=798 bgcolor=#E9E9E9
| 614798 ||  || — || October 20, 2011 || Mount Lemmon || Mount Lemmon Survey ||  || align=right | 1.3 km || 
|-id=799 bgcolor=#E9E9E9
| 614799 ||  || — || May 30, 2014 || Haleakala || Pan-STARRS ||  || align=right | 1.4 km || 
|-id=800 bgcolor=#fefefe
| 614800 ||  || — || January 26, 2000 || Kitt Peak || Spacewatch ||  || align=right data-sort-value="0.56" | 560 m || 
|}

614801–614900 

|-bgcolor=#d6d6d6
| 614801 ||  || — || January 12, 2000 || Kitt Peak || Spacewatch ||  || align=right | 2.3 km || 
|-id=802 bgcolor=#fefefe
| 614802 ||  || — || January 16, 2000 || Kitt Peak || Spacewatch ||  || align=right data-sort-value="0.81" | 810 m || 
|-id=803 bgcolor=#fefefe
| 614803 ||  || — || January 30, 2000 || Kitt Peak || Spacewatch ||  || align=right data-sort-value="0.72" | 720 m || 
|-id=804 bgcolor=#E9E9E9
| 614804 ||  || — || February 6, 2000 || Socorro || LINEAR ||  || align=right | 1.7 km || 
|-id=805 bgcolor=#fefefe
| 614805 ||  || — || January 26, 2000 || Kitt Peak || Spacewatch ||  || align=right data-sort-value="0.60" | 600 m || 
|-id=806 bgcolor=#fefefe
| 614806 ||  || — || February 8, 2000 || Kitt Peak || Spacewatch ||  || align=right data-sort-value="0.56" | 560 m || 
|-id=807 bgcolor=#d6d6d6
| 614807 ||  || — || February 14, 2000 || Kitt Peak || Spacewatch ||  || align=right | 2.8 km || 
|-id=808 bgcolor=#fefefe
| 614808 ||  || — || February 4, 2000 || Kitt Peak || Spacewatch ||  || align=right data-sort-value="0.75" | 750 m || 
|-id=809 bgcolor=#d6d6d6
| 614809 ||  || — || February 5, 2000 || Kitt Peak || Spacewatch ||  || align=right | 2.7 km || 
|-id=810 bgcolor=#fefefe
| 614810 ||  || — || November 27, 2006 || Mount Lemmon || Mount Lemmon Survey ||  || align=right data-sort-value="0.65" | 650 m || 
|-id=811 bgcolor=#fefefe
| 614811 ||  || — || March 4, 2011 || Mount Lemmon || Mount Lemmon Survey ||  || align=right data-sort-value="0.60" | 600 m || 
|-id=812 bgcolor=#fefefe
| 614812 ||  || — || March 29, 2014 || Haleakala || Pan-STARRS ||  || align=right data-sort-value="0.62" | 620 m || 
|-id=813 bgcolor=#fefefe
| 614813 ||  || — || April 2, 2011 || Haleakala || Pan-STARRS ||  || align=right data-sort-value="0.61" | 610 m || 
|-id=814 bgcolor=#E9E9E9
| 614814 ||  || — || August 21, 2006 || Kitt Peak || Spacewatch ||  || align=right | 1.1 km || 
|-id=815 bgcolor=#E9E9E9
| 614815 ||  || — || February 29, 2000 || Socorro || LINEAR ||  || align=right | 1.3 km || 
|-id=816 bgcolor=#d6d6d6
| 614816 ||  || — || March 3, 2000 || Kitt Peak || Spacewatch ||  || align=right | 2.2 km || 
|-id=817 bgcolor=#E9E9E9
| 614817 ||  || — || March 3, 2000 || Socorro || LINEAR ||  || align=right | 1.5 km || 
|-id=818 bgcolor=#E9E9E9
| 614818 ||  || — || March 5, 2000 || Cerro Tololo || D. Wittman ||  || align=right | 1.3 km || 
|-id=819 bgcolor=#fefefe
| 614819 ||  || — || April 1, 2011 || Kitt Peak || Spacewatch ||  || align=right data-sort-value="0.55" | 550 m || 
|-id=820 bgcolor=#fefefe
| 614820 ||  || — || March 30, 2000 || Kitt Peak || Spacewatch ||  || align=right data-sort-value="0.70" | 700 m || 
|-id=821 bgcolor=#fefefe
| 614821 ||  || — || March 30, 2000 || Kitt Peak || Spacewatch ||  || align=right data-sort-value="0.64" | 640 m || 
|-id=822 bgcolor=#E9E9E9
| 614822 ||  || — || April 5, 2000 || Socorro || LINEAR ||  || align=right | 1.6 km || 
|-id=823 bgcolor=#E9E9E9
| 614823 ||  || — || October 20, 2011 || Kitt Peak || Spacewatch ||  || align=right | 1.4 km || 
|-id=824 bgcolor=#fefefe
| 614824 ||  || — || February 7, 2011 || Mount Lemmon || Mount Lemmon Survey ||  || align=right data-sort-value="0.66" | 660 m || 
|-id=825 bgcolor=#fefefe
| 614825 ||  || — || April 24, 2000 || Kitt Peak || Spacewatch ||  || align=right data-sort-value="0.58" | 580 m || 
|-id=826 bgcolor=#E9E9E9
| 614826 ||  || — || April 30, 2013 || Mount Lemmon || Mount Lemmon Survey ||  || align=right | 1.4 km || 
|-id=827 bgcolor=#d6d6d6
| 614827 ||  || — || April 26, 2000 || Kitt Peak || Spacewatch ||  || align=right | 2.5 km || 
|-id=828 bgcolor=#d6d6d6
| 614828 ||  || — || October 22, 2003 || Kitt Peak || Spacewatch ||  || align=right | 2.4 km || 
|-id=829 bgcolor=#d6d6d6
| 614829 ||  || — || October 3, 2013 || Haleakala || Pan-STARRS ||  || align=right | 2.7 km || 
|-id=830 bgcolor=#d6d6d6
| 614830 ||  || — || March 14, 2000 || Catalina || CSS || Tj (2.9) || align=right | 2.1 km || 
|-id=831 bgcolor=#fefefe
| 614831 ||  || — || May 1, 2000 || Kitt Peak || Spacewatch ||  || align=right data-sort-value="0.94" | 940 m || 
|-id=832 bgcolor=#d6d6d6
| 614832 ||  || — || May 4, 2000 || Apache Point || SDSS Collaboration ||  || align=right | 3.2 km || 
|-id=833 bgcolor=#d6d6d6
| 614833 ||  || — || March 14, 2016 || Mount Lemmon || Mount Lemmon Survey ||  || align=right | 2.6 km || 
|-id=834 bgcolor=#d6d6d6
| 614834 ||  || — || March 31, 2011 || Mount Lemmon || Mount Lemmon Survey ||  || align=right | 2.6 km || 
|-id=835 bgcolor=#fefefe
| 614835 ||  || — || October 12, 2016 || Haleakala || Pan-STARRS ||  || align=right data-sort-value="0.68" | 680 m || 
|-id=836 bgcolor=#fefefe
| 614836 ||  || — || May 27, 2000 || Socorro || LINEAR ||  || align=right data-sort-value="0.85" | 850 m || 
|-id=837 bgcolor=#fefefe
| 614837 ||  || — || May 26, 2000 || Kitt Peak || Spacewatch ||  || align=right data-sort-value="0.67" | 670 m || 
|-id=838 bgcolor=#fefefe
| 614838 ||  || — || May 28, 2000 || Kitt Peak || Spacewatch ||  || align=right data-sort-value="0.71" | 710 m || 
|-id=839 bgcolor=#E9E9E9
| 614839 ||  || — || May 29, 2000 || Socorro || LINEAR ||  || align=right | 1.6 km || 
|-id=840 bgcolor=#fefefe
| 614840 ||  || — || May 29, 2000 || Kitt Peak || Spacewatch ||  || align=right data-sort-value="0.77" | 770 m || 
|-id=841 bgcolor=#fefefe
| 614841 ||  || — || November 7, 2015 || Mount Lemmon || Mount Lemmon Survey ||  || align=right data-sort-value="0.59" | 590 m || 
|-id=842 bgcolor=#d6d6d6
| 614842 ||  || — || June 25, 2000 || Kitt Peak || Spacewatch ||  || align=right | 2.9 km || 
|-id=843 bgcolor=#fefefe
| 614843 ||  || — || October 18, 2012 || Haleakala || Pan-STARRS ||  || align=right data-sort-value="0.64" | 640 m || 
|-id=844 bgcolor=#fefefe
| 614844 ||  || — || July 31, 2000 || Cerro Tololo || M. W. Buie, S. D. Kern ||  || align=right data-sort-value="0.49" | 490 m || 
|-id=845 bgcolor=#E9E9E9
| 614845 ||  || — || September 5, 2013 || Catalina || CSS ||  || align=right | 1.5 km || 
|-id=846 bgcolor=#fefefe
| 614846 ||  || — || September 5, 2008 || Kitt Peak || Spacewatch ||  || align=right data-sort-value="0.68" | 680 m || 
|-id=847 bgcolor=#fefefe
| 614847 ||  || — || October 14, 2004 || Kitt Peak || Spacewatch ||  || align=right data-sort-value="0.69" | 690 m || 
|-id=848 bgcolor=#fefefe
| 614848 ||  || — || August 26, 2000 || Socorro || LINEAR ||  || align=right data-sort-value="0.67" | 670 m || 
|-id=849 bgcolor=#FA8072
| 614849 ||  || — || August 26, 2000 || Kitt Peak || Spacewatch ||  || align=right data-sort-value="0.58" | 580 m || 
|-id=850 bgcolor=#fefefe
| 614850 ||  || — || August 25, 2000 || Cerro Tololo || R. Millis, L. H. Wasserman ||  || align=right data-sort-value="0.62" | 620 m || 
|-id=851 bgcolor=#E9E9E9
| 614851 ||  || — || August 25, 2000 || Cerro Tololo || R. Millis, L. H. Wasserman ||  || align=right | 1.4 km || 
|-id=852 bgcolor=#E9E9E9
| 614852 ||  || — || April 1, 2008 || Mount Lemmon || Mount Lemmon Survey ||  || align=right | 1.8 km || 
|-id=853 bgcolor=#E9E9E9
| 614853 ||  || — || December 15, 2006 || Kitt Peak || Spacewatch ||  || align=right | 1.8 km || 
|-id=854 bgcolor=#E9E9E9
| 614854 ||  || — || September 20, 2014 || Haleakala || Pan-STARRS ||  || align=right | 1.7 km || 
|-id=855 bgcolor=#d6d6d6
| 614855 ||  || — || February 28, 2009 || Kitt Peak || Spacewatch ||  || align=right | 2.3 km || 
|-id=856 bgcolor=#E9E9E9
| 614856 ||  || — || September 4, 2000 || Kitt Peak || Spacewatch ||  || align=right | 1.8 km || 
|-id=857 bgcolor=#E9E9E9
| 614857 ||  || — || November 14, 2010 || Sandlot || G. Hug ||  || align=right | 1.6 km || 
|-id=858 bgcolor=#fefefe
| 614858 ||  || — || February 26, 2014 || Haleakala || Pan-STARRS ||  || align=right data-sort-value="0.80" | 800 m || 
|-id=859 bgcolor=#E9E9E9
| 614859 ||  || — || January 6, 2006 || Mount Lemmon || Mount Lemmon Survey ||  || align=right data-sort-value="0.96" | 960 m || 
|-id=860 bgcolor=#E9E9E9
| 614860 ||  || — || August 13, 2012 || Haleakala || Pan-STARRS ||  || align=right data-sort-value="0.70" | 700 m || 
|-id=861 bgcolor=#E9E9E9
| 614861 ||  || — || August 27, 2014 || Haleakala || Pan-STARRS ||  || align=right | 1.7 km || 
|-id=862 bgcolor=#FA8072
| 614862 ||  || — || September 4, 2000 || Anderson Mesa || LONEOS ||  || align=right data-sort-value="0.66" | 660 m || 
|-id=863 bgcolor=#fefefe
| 614863 ||  || — || September 23, 2000 || Socorro || LINEAR ||  || align=right data-sort-value="0.62" | 620 m || 
|-id=864 bgcolor=#fefefe
| 614864 ||  || — || September 24, 2000 || Socorro || LINEAR ||  || align=right data-sort-value="0.67" | 670 m || 
|-id=865 bgcolor=#E9E9E9
| 614865 ||  || — || September 23, 2000 || Socorro || LINEAR ||  || align=right | 2.2 km || 
|-id=866 bgcolor=#fefefe
| 614866 ||  || — || September 27, 2000 || Kitt Peak || Spacewatch ||  || align=right data-sort-value="0.50" | 500 m || 
|-id=867 bgcolor=#E9E9E9
| 614867 ||  || — || August 9, 2004 || Siding Spring || SSS ||  || align=right | 1.8 km || 
|-id=868 bgcolor=#fefefe
| 614868 ||  || — || November 9, 2013 || Mount Lemmon || Mount Lemmon Survey ||  || align=right data-sort-value="0.61" | 610 m || 
|-id=869 bgcolor=#E9E9E9
| 614869 ||  || — || September 26, 2000 || Kitt Peak || Spacewatch ||  || align=right | 1.8 km || 
|-id=870 bgcolor=#E9E9E9
| 614870 ||  || — || November 30, 2010 || Mount Lemmon || Mount Lemmon Survey ||  || align=right | 2.0 km || 
|-id=871 bgcolor=#fefefe
| 614871 ||  || — || March 16, 2012 || Mount Lemmon || Mount Lemmon Survey ||  || align=right data-sort-value="0.65" | 650 m || 
|-id=872 bgcolor=#C2FFFF
| 614872 ||  || — || October 12, 2013 || Mount Lemmon || Mount Lemmon Survey || L5 || align=right | 7.7 km || 
|-id=873 bgcolor=#fefefe
| 614873 ||  || — || October 5, 2000 || Kitt Peak || Spacewatch ||  || align=right data-sort-value="0.73" | 730 m || 
|-id=874 bgcolor=#fefefe
| 614874 ||  || — || October 1, 2000 || Socorro || LINEAR ||  || align=right | 1.0 km || 
|-id=875 bgcolor=#d6d6d6
| 614875 ||  || — || May 15, 2004 || Campo Imperatore || CINEOS ||  || align=right | 2.7 km || 
|-id=876 bgcolor=#E9E9E9
| 614876 ||  || — || December 13, 2015 || Haleakala || Pan-STARRS ||  || align=right | 1.9 km || 
|-id=877 bgcolor=#fefefe
| 614877 ||  || — || December 8, 2010 || Kitt Peak || Spacewatch ||  || align=right data-sort-value="0.63" | 630 m || 
|-id=878 bgcolor=#E9E9E9
| 614878 ||  || — || October 7, 2012 || Haleakala || Pan-STARRS ||  || align=right data-sort-value="0.68" | 680 m || 
|-id=879 bgcolor=#fefefe
| 614879 ||  || — || October 1, 2000 || Socorro || LINEAR ||  || align=right data-sort-value="0.84" | 840 m || 
|-id=880 bgcolor=#fefefe
| 614880 ||  || — || October 6, 2000 || Anderson Mesa || LONEOS ||  || align=right data-sort-value="0.87" | 870 m || 
|-id=881 bgcolor=#d6d6d6
| 614881 ||  || — || September 25, 2011 || Haleakala || Pan-STARRS ||  || align=right | 2.1 km || 
|-id=882 bgcolor=#fefefe
| 614882 ||  || — || November 20, 2000 || Kitt Peak || Spacewatch ||  || align=right data-sort-value="0.65" | 650 m || 
|-id=883 bgcolor=#fefefe
| 614883 ||  || — || November 19, 2000 || Kitt Peak || Spacewatch ||  || align=right data-sort-value="0.58" | 580 m || 
|-id=884 bgcolor=#E9E9E9
| 614884 ||  || — || November 19, 2000 || Kitt Peak || Spacewatch ||  || align=right | 1.2 km || 
|-id=885 bgcolor=#d6d6d6
| 614885 ||  || — || June 2, 2003 || Kitt Peak || Spacewatch ||  || align=right | 4.2 km || 
|-id=886 bgcolor=#fefefe
| 614886 ||  || — || October 21, 2011 || Mount Lemmon || Mount Lemmon Survey ||  || align=right data-sort-value="0.76" | 760 m || 
|-id=887 bgcolor=#E9E9E9
| 614887 ||  || — || August 6, 2008 || Siding Spring || SSS ||  || align=right | 1.1 km || 
|-id=888 bgcolor=#d6d6d6
| 614888 ||  || — || November 30, 2005 || Kitt Peak || Spacewatch ||  || align=right | 2.0 km || 
|-id=889 bgcolor=#E9E9E9
| 614889 ||  || — || December 31, 2000 || Haleakala || AMOS ||  || align=right | 1.4 km || 
|-id=890 bgcolor=#fefefe
| 614890 ||  || — || October 23, 2003 || Kitt Peak || Spacewatch ||  || align=right data-sort-value="0.68" | 680 m || 
|-id=891 bgcolor=#d6d6d6
| 614891 ||  || — || June 10, 2015 || Haleakala || Pan-STARRS ||  || align=right | 2.8 km || 
|-id=892 bgcolor=#E9E9E9
| 614892 ||  || — || February 16, 2001 || Kitt Peak || Spacewatch ||  || align=right data-sort-value="0.91" | 910 m || 
|-id=893 bgcolor=#E9E9E9
| 614893 ||  || — || January 29, 2009 || Mount Lemmon || Mount Lemmon Survey ||  || align=right data-sort-value="0.94" | 940 m || 
|-id=894 bgcolor=#E9E9E9
| 614894 ||  || — || November 28, 2016 || Haleakala || Pan-STARRS ||  || align=right data-sort-value="0.89" | 890 m || 
|-id=895 bgcolor=#E9E9E9
| 614895 ||  || — || December 19, 2003 || Kitt Peak || Spacewatch ||  || align=right data-sort-value="0.94" | 940 m || 
|-id=896 bgcolor=#E9E9E9
| 614896 ||  || — || August 10, 2007 || Kitt Peak || Spacewatch ||  || align=right data-sort-value="0.90" | 900 m || 
|-id=897 bgcolor=#E9E9E9
| 614897 ||  || — || December 5, 2008 || Mount Lemmon || Mount Lemmon Survey ||  || align=right data-sort-value="0.93" | 930 m || 
|-id=898 bgcolor=#d6d6d6
| 614898 ||  || — || March 24, 2001 || Kitt Peak || Spacewatch ||  || align=right | 2.3 km || 
|-id=899 bgcolor=#E9E9E9
| 614899 ||  || — || September 19, 2007 || Kitt Peak || Spacewatch ||  || align=right | 1.1 km || 
|-id=900 bgcolor=#E9E9E9
| 614900 ||  || — || March 21, 2001 || Kitt Peak || Kitt Peak Obs. ||  || align=right data-sort-value="0.80" | 800 m || 
|}

614901–615000 

|-bgcolor=#E9E9E9
| 614901 ||  || — || March 22, 2001 || Kitt Peak || Kitt Peak Obs. ||  || align=right data-sort-value="0.66" | 660 m || 
|-id=902 bgcolor=#fefefe
| 614902 ||  || — || March 22, 2001 || Kitt Peak || Kitt Peak Obs. ||  || align=right data-sort-value="0.58" | 580 m || 
|-id=903 bgcolor=#fefefe
| 614903 ||  || — || March 23, 2001 || Kitt Peak || Kitt Peak Obs. ||  || align=right data-sort-value="0.50" | 500 m || 
|-id=904 bgcolor=#fefefe
| 614904 ||  || — || June 8, 2005 || Kitt Peak || Spacewatch ||  || align=right data-sort-value="0.59" | 590 m || 
|-id=905 bgcolor=#d6d6d6
| 614905 ||  || — || March 22, 2001 || Kitt Peak || Spacewatch || Tj (2.99) || align=right | 2.9 km || 
|-id=906 bgcolor=#fefefe
| 614906 ||  || — || March 20, 2001 || Kitt Peak || Spacewatch ||  || align=right data-sort-value="0.58" | 580 m || 
|-id=907 bgcolor=#d6d6d6
| 614907 ||  || — || February 1, 2006 || Kitt Peak || Spacewatch ||  || align=right | 2.1 km || 
|-id=908 bgcolor=#E9E9E9
| 614908 ||  || — || January 25, 2009 || Kitt Peak || Spacewatch ||  || align=right data-sort-value="0.84" | 840 m || 
|-id=909 bgcolor=#fefefe
| 614909 ||  || — || June 17, 2012 || Mount Lemmon || Mount Lemmon Survey ||  || align=right data-sort-value="0.46" | 460 m || 
|-id=910 bgcolor=#FA8072
| 614910 ||  || — || April 25, 2001 || Anderson Mesa || LONEOS || Tj (2.9) || align=right | 2.6 km || 
|-id=911 bgcolor=#fefefe
| 614911 ||  || — || May 16, 2001 || Kitt Peak || Spacewatch ||  || align=right data-sort-value="0.83" | 830 m || 
|-id=912 bgcolor=#d6d6d6
| 614912 ||  || — || February 27, 2012 || Haleakala || Pan-STARRS ||  || align=right | 2.4 km || 
|-id=913 bgcolor=#d6d6d6
| 614913 ||  || — || February 3, 2016 || Haleakala || Pan-STARRS ||  || align=right | 2.4 km || 
|-id=914 bgcolor=#E9E9E9
| 614914 ||  || — || November 18, 2003 || Kitt Peak || Spacewatch ||  || align=right | 1.5 km || 
|-id=915 bgcolor=#E9E9E9
| 614915 ||  || — || April 5, 2005 || Palomar || NEAT ||  || align=right data-sort-value="0.89" | 890 m || 
|-id=916 bgcolor=#d6d6d6
| 614916 ||  || — || September 24, 2008 || Kitt Peak || Spacewatch ||  || align=right | 2.4 km || 
|-id=917 bgcolor=#fefefe
| 614917 ||  || — || April 20, 2012 || Mount Lemmon || Mount Lemmon Survey ||  || align=right data-sort-value="0.63" | 630 m || 
|-id=918 bgcolor=#fefefe
| 614918 ||  || — || September 26, 2012 || Mount Lemmon || Mount Lemmon Survey ||  || align=right data-sort-value="0.55" | 550 m || 
|-id=919 bgcolor=#fefefe
| 614919 ||  || — || September 18, 2009 || Mount Lemmon || Mount Lemmon Survey ||  || align=right data-sort-value="0.64" | 640 m || 
|-id=920 bgcolor=#fefefe
| 614920 ||  || — || April 18, 2015 || Kitt Peak || Spacewatch ||  || align=right data-sort-value="0.60" | 600 m || 
|-id=921 bgcolor=#d6d6d6
| 614921 ||  || — || September 13, 2013 || Mount Lemmon || Mount Lemmon Survey ||  || align=right | 2.8 km || 
|-id=922 bgcolor=#E9E9E9
| 614922 ||  || — || February 22, 2009 || Kitt Peak || Spacewatch ||  || align=right | 1.3 km || 
|-id=923 bgcolor=#fefefe
| 614923 ||  || — || December 29, 2013 || Haleakala || Pan-STARRS ||  || align=right data-sort-value="0.87" | 870 m || 
|-id=924 bgcolor=#d6d6d6
| 614924 ||  || — || November 20, 2008 || Kitt Peak || Spacewatch ||  || align=right | 3.3 km || 
|-id=925 bgcolor=#E9E9E9
| 614925 ||  || — || November 1, 2015 || Haleakala || Pan-STARRS ||  || align=right | 1.9 km || 
|-id=926 bgcolor=#d6d6d6
| 614926 ||  || — || November 4, 2013 || Haleakala || Pan-STARRS ||  || align=right | 2.4 km || 
|-id=927 bgcolor=#d6d6d6
| 614927 ||  || — || February 4, 2005 || Mount Lemmon || Mount Lemmon Survey ||  || align=right | 2.7 km || 
|-id=928 bgcolor=#FA8072
| 614928 ||  || — || June 28, 2001 || Palomar || NEAT ||  || align=right data-sort-value="0.66" | 660 m || 
|-id=929 bgcolor=#fefefe
| 614929 ||  || — || July 17, 2001 || Palomar || NEAT ||  || align=right data-sort-value="0.67" | 670 m || 
|-id=930 bgcolor=#fefefe
| 614930 ||  || — || July 18, 2001 || Palomar || NEAT ||  || align=right data-sort-value="0.81" | 810 m || 
|-id=931 bgcolor=#E9E9E9
| 614931 ||  || — || July 18, 2001 || Palomar || NEAT ||  || align=right | 1.0 km || 
|-id=932 bgcolor=#E9E9E9
| 614932 ||  || — || July 18, 2001 || Palomar || NEAT ||  || align=right | 2.0 km || 
|-id=933 bgcolor=#FA8072
| 614933 ||  || — || July 21, 2001 || Haleakala || AMOS ||  || align=right | 1.3 km || 
|-id=934 bgcolor=#d6d6d6
| 614934 ||  || — || July 13, 2001 || Palomar || NEAT ||  || align=right | 3.3 km || 
|-id=935 bgcolor=#d6d6d6
| 614935 ||  || — || October 16, 2007 || Mount Lemmon || Mount Lemmon Survey ||  || align=right | 2.5 km || 
|-id=936 bgcolor=#E9E9E9
| 614936 ||  || — || May 25, 2014 || Haleakala || Pan-STARRS ||  || align=right | 1.6 km || 
|-id=937 bgcolor=#fefefe
| 614937 ||  || — || October 13, 2016 || Mount Lemmon || Mount Lemmon Survey ||  || align=right data-sort-value="0.74" | 740 m || 
|-id=938 bgcolor=#d6d6d6
| 614938 ||  || — || July 19, 2001 || Palomar || NEAT ||  || align=right | 2.9 km || 
|-id=939 bgcolor=#d6d6d6
| 614939 ||  || — || August 9, 2001 || Palomar || NEAT ||  || align=right | 3.1 km || 
|-id=940 bgcolor=#fefefe
| 614940 ||  || — || August 11, 2001 || Haleakala || AMOS ||  || align=right data-sort-value="0.77" | 770 m || 
|-id=941 bgcolor=#E9E9E9
| 614941 ||  || — || August 12, 2001 || Haleakala || AMOS ||  || align=right | 1.3 km || 
|-id=942 bgcolor=#d6d6d6
| 614942 ||  || — || July 30, 2001 || Palomar || NEAT ||  || align=right | 2.8 km || 
|-id=943 bgcolor=#fefefe
| 614943 ||  || — || August 14, 2001 || Haleakala || AMOS ||  || align=right data-sort-value="0.76" | 760 m || 
|-id=944 bgcolor=#E9E9E9
| 614944 ||  || — || August 1, 2001 || Palomar || NEAT ||  || align=right | 1.4 km || 
|-id=945 bgcolor=#fefefe
| 614945 ||  || — || August 16, 2001 || Socorro || LINEAR ||  || align=right data-sort-value="0.72" | 720 m || 
|-id=946 bgcolor=#FA8072
| 614946 ||  || — || July 25, 2001 || Haleakala || AMOS ||  || align=right data-sort-value="0.71" | 710 m || 
|-id=947 bgcolor=#FA8072
| 614947 ||  || — || August 23, 2001 || Socorro || LINEAR || H || align=right data-sort-value="0.58" | 580 m || 
|-id=948 bgcolor=#fefefe
| 614948 ||  || — || August 14, 2001 || Haleakala || AMOS ||  || align=right data-sort-value="0.75" | 750 m || 
|-id=949 bgcolor=#E9E9E9
| 614949 ||  || — || August 17, 2001 || Palomar || NEAT ||  || align=right | 1.6 km || 
|-id=950 bgcolor=#FA8072
| 614950 ||  || — || August 19, 2001 || Socorro || LINEAR ||  || align=right data-sort-value="0.58" | 580 m || 
|-id=951 bgcolor=#fefefe
| 614951 ||  || — || August 19, 2001 || Cerro Tololo || Cerro Tololo Obs. ||  || align=right data-sort-value="0.58" | 580 m || 
|-id=952 bgcolor=#fefefe
| 614952 ||  || — || August 19, 2001 || Cerro Tololo || Cerro Tololo Obs. ||  || align=right data-sort-value="0.88" | 880 m || 
|-id=953 bgcolor=#fefefe
| 614953 ||  || — || August 24, 2001 || Anderson Mesa || LONEOS ||  || align=right data-sort-value="0.75" | 750 m || 
|-id=954 bgcolor=#fefefe
| 614954 ||  || — || August 13, 2012 || Haleakala || Pan-STARRS ||  || align=right data-sort-value="0.63" | 630 m || 
|-id=955 bgcolor=#fefefe
| 614955 ||  || — || August 25, 2001 || Kitt Peak || Spacewatch ||  || align=right data-sort-value="0.62" | 620 m || 
|-id=956 bgcolor=#d6d6d6
| 614956 ||  || — || August 24, 2001 || Kitt Peak || Spacewatch ||  || align=right | 2.3 km || 
|-id=957 bgcolor=#E9E9E9
| 614957 ||  || — || September 8, 2001 || Socorro || LINEAR || critical || align=right data-sort-value="0.73" | 730 m || 
|-id=958 bgcolor=#d6d6d6
| 614958 ||  || — || May 22, 2001 || Cerro Tololo || J. L. Elliot, L. H. Wasserman ||  || align=right | 2.7 km || 
|-id=959 bgcolor=#fefefe
| 614959 ||  || — || September 12, 2001 || Socorro || LINEAR ||  || align=right data-sort-value="0.80" | 800 m || 
|-id=960 bgcolor=#d6d6d6
| 614960 ||  || — || September 12, 2001 || Kitt Peak || Spacewatch ||  || align=right | 3.4 km || 
|-id=961 bgcolor=#fefefe
| 614961 ||  || — || August 24, 2001 || Kitt Peak || Spacewatch ||  || align=right data-sort-value="0.48" | 480 m || 
|-id=962 bgcolor=#fefefe
| 614962 ||  || — || September 12, 2001 || Socorro || LINEAR ||  || align=right data-sort-value="0.73" | 730 m || 
|-id=963 bgcolor=#E9E9E9
| 614963 ||  || — || August 28, 2001 || Palomar || NEAT ||  || align=right | 1.3 km || 
|-id=964 bgcolor=#fefefe
| 614964 ||  || — || August 16, 2001 || Socorro || LINEAR ||  || align=right data-sort-value="0.71" | 710 m || 
|-id=965 bgcolor=#fefefe
| 614965 ||  || — || September 12, 2001 || Socorro || LINEAR ||  || align=right data-sort-value="0.51" | 510 m || 
|-id=966 bgcolor=#E9E9E9
| 614966 ||  || — || April 10, 2013 || Haleakala || Pan-STARRS ||  || align=right | 1.7 km || 
|-id=967 bgcolor=#fefefe
| 614967 ||  || — || June 17, 2004 || Kitt Peak || Spacewatch ||  || align=right data-sort-value="0.73" | 730 m || 
|-id=968 bgcolor=#E9E9E9
| 614968 ||  || — || January 13, 2011 || Mount Lemmon || Mount Lemmon Survey ||  || align=right data-sort-value="0.78" | 780 m || 
|-id=969 bgcolor=#E9E9E9
| 614969 ||  || — || August 26, 2001 || Kitt Peak || Spacewatch ||  || align=right | 1.4 km || 
|-id=970 bgcolor=#d6d6d6
| 614970 ||  || — || September 20, 2001 || Socorro || LINEAR ||  || align=right | 2.6 km || 
|-id=971 bgcolor=#fefefe
| 614971 ||  || — || May 23, 2001 || Cerro Tololo || J. L. Elliot, L. H. Wasserman ||  || align=right data-sort-value="0.94" | 940 m || 
|-id=972 bgcolor=#fefefe
| 614972 ||  || — || September 19, 2001 || Socorro || LINEAR ||  || align=right data-sort-value="0.84" | 840 m || 
|-id=973 bgcolor=#fefefe
| 614973 ||  || — || September 12, 2001 || Kitt Peak || Spacewatch ||  || align=right data-sort-value="0.81" | 810 m || 
|-id=974 bgcolor=#fefefe
| 614974 ||  || — || August 25, 2001 || Anderson Mesa || LONEOS ||  || align=right data-sort-value="0.84" | 840 m || 
|-id=975 bgcolor=#E9E9E9
| 614975 ||  || — || September 19, 2001 || Socorro || LINEAR ||  || align=right | 2.5 km || 
|-id=976 bgcolor=#fefefe
| 614976 ||  || — || May 23, 2001 || Cerro Tololo || J. L. Elliot, L. H. Wasserman ||  || align=right data-sort-value="0.57" | 570 m || 
|-id=977 bgcolor=#fefefe
| 614977 ||  || — || August 27, 2001 || Anderson Mesa || LONEOS ||  || align=right data-sort-value="0.67" | 670 m || 
|-id=978 bgcolor=#E9E9E9
| 614978 ||  || — || September 19, 2001 || Socorro || LINEAR ||  || align=right | 1.3 km || 
|-id=979 bgcolor=#fefefe
| 614979 ||  || — || September 19, 2001 || Socorro || LINEAR ||  || align=right data-sort-value="0.72" | 720 m || 
|-id=980 bgcolor=#fefefe
| 614980 ||  || — || September 19, 2001 || Socorro || LINEAR ||  || align=right data-sort-value="0.66" | 660 m || 
|-id=981 bgcolor=#fefefe
| 614981 ||  || — || August 24, 2001 || Socorro || LINEAR ||  || align=right data-sort-value="0.76" | 760 m || 
|-id=982 bgcolor=#E9E9E9
| 614982 ||  || — || September 19, 2001 || Socorro || LINEAR ||  || align=right | 2.0 km || 
|-id=983 bgcolor=#E9E9E9
| 614983 ||  || — || September 20, 2001 || Socorro || LINEAR ||  || align=right | 1.4 km || 
|-id=984 bgcolor=#fefefe
| 614984 ||  || — || September 20, 2001 || Kitt Peak || Spacewatch ||  || align=right data-sort-value="0.74" | 740 m || 
|-id=985 bgcolor=#E9E9E9
| 614985 ||  || — || September 12, 2001 || Kitt Peak || Spacewatch ||  || align=right | 1.3 km || 
|-id=986 bgcolor=#fefefe
| 614986 ||  || — || September 18, 2001 || Kitt Peak || Spacewatch ||  || align=right data-sort-value="0.68" | 680 m || 
|-id=987 bgcolor=#d6d6d6
| 614987 ||  || — || September 23, 2001 || Socorro || LINEAR ||  || align=right | 3.8 km || 
|-id=988 bgcolor=#E9E9E9
| 614988 ||  || — || August 28, 2001 || Kitt Peak || Spacewatch ||  || align=right | 2.0 km || 
|-id=989 bgcolor=#E9E9E9
| 614989 ||  || — || July 11, 2005 || Mount Lemmon || Mount Lemmon Survey ||  || align=right | 1.9 km || 
|-id=990 bgcolor=#E9E9E9
| 614990 ||  || — || July 28, 2014 || Haleakala || Pan-STARRS ||  || align=right | 1.3 km || 
|-id=991 bgcolor=#d6d6d6
| 614991 ||  || — || January 21, 2015 || Haleakala || Pan-STARRS ||  || align=right | 2.8 km || 
|-id=992 bgcolor=#E9E9E9
| 614992 ||  || — || October 7, 2001 || Palomar || NEAT ||  || align=right | 2.5 km || 
|-id=993 bgcolor=#fefefe
| 614993 ||  || — || September 28, 2001 || Palomar || NEAT ||  || align=right data-sort-value="0.77" | 770 m || 
|-id=994 bgcolor=#fefefe
| 614994 ||  || — || October 10, 2001 || Palomar || NEAT ||  || align=right data-sort-value="0.65" | 650 m || 
|-id=995 bgcolor=#fefefe
| 614995 ||  || — || September 28, 2001 || Palomar || NEAT ||  || align=right data-sort-value="0.89" | 890 m || 
|-id=996 bgcolor=#fefefe
| 614996 ||  || — || October 14, 2001 || Socorro || LINEAR ||  || align=right data-sort-value="0.77" | 770 m || 
|-id=997 bgcolor=#fefefe
| 614997 ||  || — || October 11, 2001 || Palomar || NEAT ||  || align=right data-sort-value="0.61" | 610 m || 
|-id=998 bgcolor=#d6d6d6
| 614998 ||  || — || September 12, 2001 || Kitt Peak || Spacewatch ||  || align=right | 2.7 km || 
|-id=999 bgcolor=#fefefe
| 614999 ||  || — || October 13, 2001 || Socorro || LINEAR ||  || align=right data-sort-value="0.68" | 680 m || 
|-id=000 bgcolor=#E9E9E9
| 615000 ||  || — || December 15, 2006 || Kitt Peak || Spacewatch ||  || align=right | 1.6 km || 
|}

References

External links 
 Discovery Circumstances: Numbered Minor Planets (610001)–(615000) (IAU Minor Planet Center)

0614